

544001–544100 

|-bgcolor=#E9E9E9
| 544001 ||  || — || November 6, 2010 || Mount Lemmon || Mount Lemmon Survey ||  || align=right data-sort-value="0.94" | 940 m || 
|-id=002 bgcolor=#E9E9E9
| 544002 ||  || — || September 13, 2005 || Kitt Peak || Spacewatch ||  || align=right | 1.1 km || 
|-id=003 bgcolor=#E9E9E9
| 544003 ||  || — || May 28, 2008 || Mount Lemmon || Mount Lemmon Survey ||  || align=right | 2.3 km || 
|-id=004 bgcolor=#E9E9E9
| 544004 ||  || — || January 19, 2012 || Kitt Peak || Spacewatch ||  || align=right | 1.7 km || 
|-id=005 bgcolor=#fefefe
| 544005 ||  || — || September 13, 2007 || Mount Lemmon || Mount Lemmon Survey ||  || align=right data-sort-value="0.64" | 640 m || 
|-id=006 bgcolor=#E9E9E9
| 544006 ||  || — || September 12, 2010 || Mount Lemmon || Mount Lemmon Survey ||  || align=right | 1.3 km || 
|-id=007 bgcolor=#E9E9E9
| 544007 ||  || — || August 19, 2006 || Kitt Peak || Spacewatch ||  || align=right data-sort-value="0.73" | 730 m || 
|-id=008 bgcolor=#E9E9E9
| 544008 ||  || — || February 28, 2008 || Mount Lemmon || Mount Lemmon Survey ||  || align=right data-sort-value="0.62" | 620 m || 
|-id=009 bgcolor=#E9E9E9
| 544009 ||  || — || July 7, 2014 || Haleakala || Pan-STARRS ||  || align=right | 1.4 km || 
|-id=010 bgcolor=#fefefe
| 544010 ||  || — || August 6, 2014 || Kitt Peak || Spacewatch ||  || align=right data-sort-value="0.64" | 640 m || 
|-id=011 bgcolor=#E9E9E9
| 544011 ||  || — || July 17, 2010 || WISE || WISE ||  || align=right data-sort-value="0.93" | 930 m || 
|-id=012 bgcolor=#fefefe
| 544012 ||  || — || March 26, 2003 || Palomar || NEAT ||  || align=right data-sort-value="0.86" | 860 m || 
|-id=013 bgcolor=#fefefe
| 544013 ||  || — || February 4, 2006 || Kitt Peak || Spacewatch ||  || align=right data-sort-value="0.93" | 930 m || 
|-id=014 bgcolor=#E9E9E9
| 544014 ||  || — || August 31, 2014 || Haleakala || Pan-STARRS ||  || align=right | 1.2 km || 
|-id=015 bgcolor=#d6d6d6
| 544015 ||  || — || January 12, 1996 || Kitt Peak || Spacewatch ||  || align=right | 3.3 km || 
|-id=016 bgcolor=#E9E9E9
| 544016 ||  || — || May 12, 2013 || Haleakala || Pan-STARRS ||  || align=right | 1.7 km || 
|-id=017 bgcolor=#E9E9E9
| 544017 ||  || — || August 20, 2014 || Haleakala || Pan-STARRS ||  || align=right | 2.0 km || 
|-id=018 bgcolor=#E9E9E9
| 544018 ||  || — || December 1, 2010 || Mount Lemmon || Mount Lemmon Survey ||  || align=right | 2.1 km || 
|-id=019 bgcolor=#E9E9E9
| 544019 ||  || — || January 11, 2003 || Kitt Peak || Spacewatch ||  || align=right | 1.9 km || 
|-id=020 bgcolor=#E9E9E9
| 544020 ||  || — || June 26, 2014 || Mount Lemmon || Mount Lemmon Survey ||  || align=right data-sort-value="0.93" | 930 m || 
|-id=021 bgcolor=#E9E9E9
| 544021 ||  || — || November 15, 2006 || Mount Lemmon || Mount Lemmon Survey ||  || align=right | 1.9 km || 
|-id=022 bgcolor=#E9E9E9
| 544022 ||  || — || August 30, 2005 || Anderson Mesa || LONEOS ||  || align=right | 1.3 km || 
|-id=023 bgcolor=#E9E9E9
| 544023 ||  || — || September 2, 2014 || Haleakala || Pan-STARRS ||  || align=right data-sort-value="0.81" | 810 m || 
|-id=024 bgcolor=#E9E9E9
| 544024 ||  || — || September 6, 2014 || Mount Lemmon || Mount Lemmon Survey ||  || align=right | 1.4 km || 
|-id=025 bgcolor=#d6d6d6
| 544025 ||  || — || August 29, 2009 || Catalina || CSS ||  || align=right | 2.5 km || 
|-id=026 bgcolor=#E9E9E9
| 544026 ||  || — || October 18, 2001 || Palomar || NEAT ||  || align=right | 1.9 km || 
|-id=027 bgcolor=#fefefe
| 544027 ||  || — || October 11, 2007 || La Canada || J. Lacruz ||  || align=right data-sort-value="0.75" | 750 m || 
|-id=028 bgcolor=#fefefe
| 544028 ||  || — || September 12, 2007 || Mount Lemmon || Mount Lemmon Survey ||  || align=right data-sort-value="0.86" | 860 m || 
|-id=029 bgcolor=#fefefe
| 544029 ||  || — || May 3, 2006 || Mount Lemmon || Mount Lemmon Survey ||  || align=right data-sort-value="0.90" | 900 m || 
|-id=030 bgcolor=#E9E9E9
| 544030 ||  || — || October 29, 2010 || Mount Lemmon || Mount Lemmon Survey ||  || align=right | 1.6 km || 
|-id=031 bgcolor=#E9E9E9
| 544031 ||  || — || September 27, 2006 || Mount Lemmon || Mount Lemmon Survey ||  || align=right | 2.0 km || 
|-id=032 bgcolor=#d6d6d6
| 544032 ||  || — || June 22, 2009 || Mount Lemmon || Mount Lemmon Survey ||  || align=right | 2.5 km || 
|-id=033 bgcolor=#fefefe
| 544033 Lihsing ||  ||  || September 15, 2007 || Lulin || H.-C. Lin, Q.-z. Ye ||  || align=right data-sort-value="0.71" | 710 m || 
|-id=034 bgcolor=#fefefe
| 544034 ||  || — || August 5, 2014 || Haleakala || Pan-STARRS ||  || align=right data-sort-value="0.68" | 680 m || 
|-id=035 bgcolor=#E9E9E9
| 544035 ||  || — || October 19, 2006 || Kitt Peak || Spacewatch ||  || align=right | 1.5 km || 
|-id=036 bgcolor=#E9E9E9
| 544036 ||  || — || January 19, 2012 || Haleakala || Pan-STARRS ||  || align=right data-sort-value="0.79" | 790 m || 
|-id=037 bgcolor=#fefefe
| 544037 ||  || — || December 1, 2008 || Kitt Peak || Spacewatch ||  || align=right data-sort-value="0.73" | 730 m || 
|-id=038 bgcolor=#E9E9E9
| 544038 ||  || — || February 26, 2012 || Haleakala || Pan-STARRS ||  || align=right | 1.0 km || 
|-id=039 bgcolor=#E9E9E9
| 544039 ||  || — || September 1, 2014 || Catalina || CSS ||  || align=right data-sort-value="0.86" | 860 m || 
|-id=040 bgcolor=#E9E9E9
| 544040 ||  || — || November 25, 2006 || Mount Lemmon || Mount Lemmon Survey ||  || align=right | 1.3 km || 
|-id=041 bgcolor=#fefefe
| 544041 ||  || — || June 3, 2006 || Mount Lemmon || Mount Lemmon Survey ||  || align=right data-sort-value="0.89" | 890 m || 
|-id=042 bgcolor=#E9E9E9
| 544042 ||  || — || October 2, 2010 || Mount Lemmon || Mount Lemmon Survey ||  || align=right data-sort-value="0.89" | 890 m || 
|-id=043 bgcolor=#E9E9E9
| 544043 ||  || — || August 22, 2014 || Haleakala || Pan-STARRS ||  || align=right | 2.1 km || 
|-id=044 bgcolor=#E9E9E9
| 544044 ||  || — || September 14, 2014 || Mount Lemmon || Mount Lemmon Survey ||  || align=right | 1.3 km || 
|-id=045 bgcolor=#E9E9E9
| 544045 ||  || — || October 13, 2010 || Mount Lemmon || Mount Lemmon Survey ||  || align=right | 1.5 km || 
|-id=046 bgcolor=#E9E9E9
| 544046 ||  || — || July 26, 2014 || Haleakala || Pan-STARRS ||  || align=right data-sort-value="0.79" | 790 m || 
|-id=047 bgcolor=#fefefe
| 544047 ||  || — || March 3, 2006 || Kitt Peak || Spacewatch ||  || align=right data-sort-value="0.79" | 790 m || 
|-id=048 bgcolor=#E9E9E9
| 544048 ||  || — || March 2, 2008 || Kitt Peak || Spacewatch ||  || align=right | 1.3 km || 
|-id=049 bgcolor=#fefefe
| 544049 ||  || — || October 20, 2003 || Palomar || NEAT ||  || align=right data-sort-value="0.83" | 830 m || 
|-id=050 bgcolor=#d6d6d6
| 544050 ||  || — || September 19, 2009 || Mount Lemmon || Mount Lemmon Survey ||  || align=right | 1.6 km || 
|-id=051 bgcolor=#E9E9E9
| 544051 ||  || — || November 6, 2005 || Kitt Peak || Spacewatch ||  || align=right | 2.0 km || 
|-id=052 bgcolor=#fefefe
| 544052 ||  || — || September 30, 2003 || Kitt Peak || Spacewatch ||  || align=right data-sort-value="0.87" | 870 m || 
|-id=053 bgcolor=#fefefe
| 544053 ||  || — || March 26, 2001 || Kitt Peak || Spacewatch ||  || align=right | 1.2 km || 
|-id=054 bgcolor=#E9E9E9
| 544054 ||  || — || October 22, 2006 || Mount Lemmon || Mount Lemmon Survey ||  || align=right data-sort-value="0.98" | 980 m || 
|-id=055 bgcolor=#E9E9E9
| 544055 ||  || — || November 25, 2006 || Kitt Peak || Spacewatch ||  || align=right | 2.0 km || 
|-id=056 bgcolor=#d6d6d6
| 544056 ||  || — || October 24, 2009 || Mount Lemmon || Mount Lemmon Survey ||  || align=right | 2.4 km || 
|-id=057 bgcolor=#E9E9E9
| 544057 ||  || — || September 14, 2014 || Haleakala || Pan-STARRS ||  || align=right | 1.6 km || 
|-id=058 bgcolor=#E9E9E9
| 544058 ||  || — || November 17, 2010 || Mount Lemmon || Mount Lemmon Survey ||  || align=right | 2.4 km || 
|-id=059 bgcolor=#E9E9E9
| 544059 ||  || — || September 2, 2014 || Haleakala || Pan-STARRS ||  || align=right | 1.3 km || 
|-id=060 bgcolor=#E9E9E9
| 544060 ||  || — || February 25, 2012 || Kitt Peak || Spacewatch ||  || align=right | 1.4 km || 
|-id=061 bgcolor=#E9E9E9
| 544061 ||  || — || July 8, 2005 || Kitt Peak || Spacewatch ||  || align=right | 1.5 km || 
|-id=062 bgcolor=#E9E9E9
| 544062 ||  || — || August 5, 2005 || Palomar || NEAT ||  || align=right data-sort-value="0.99" | 990 m || 
|-id=063 bgcolor=#E9E9E9
| 544063 ||  || — || December 13, 2010 || Kitt Peak || Spacewatch ||  || align=right | 2.4 km || 
|-id=064 bgcolor=#E9E9E9
| 544064 ||  || — || September 2, 2014 || Haleakala || Pan-STARRS ||  || align=right | 1.8 km || 
|-id=065 bgcolor=#E9E9E9
| 544065 ||  || — || October 30, 2005 || Kitt Peak || Spacewatch ||  || align=right | 1.7 km || 
|-id=066 bgcolor=#E9E9E9
| 544066 ||  || — || March 6, 2008 || Mount Lemmon || Mount Lemmon Survey ||  || align=right | 2.3 km || 
|-id=067 bgcolor=#E9E9E9
| 544067 ||  || — || September 10, 2010 || Mount Lemmon || Mount Lemmon Survey ||  || align=right | 1.2 km || 
|-id=068 bgcolor=#E9E9E9
| 544068 ||  || — || August 20, 2014 || Haleakala || Pan-STARRS ||  || align=right | 1.2 km || 
|-id=069 bgcolor=#fefefe
| 544069 ||  || — || October 14, 2007 || Mount Lemmon || Mount Lemmon Survey ||  || align=right data-sort-value="0.75" | 750 m || 
|-id=070 bgcolor=#E9E9E9
| 544070 ||  || — || May 18, 2009 || Mount Lemmon || Mount Lemmon Survey ||  || align=right | 1.0 km || 
|-id=071 bgcolor=#fefefe
| 544071 ||  || — || December 6, 2007 || Mount Lemmon || Mount Lemmon Survey ||  || align=right data-sort-value="0.73" | 730 m || 
|-id=072 bgcolor=#fefefe
| 544072 ||  || — || October 12, 2007 || Kitt Peak || Spacewatch ||  || align=right data-sort-value="0.76" | 760 m || 
|-id=073 bgcolor=#E9E9E9
| 544073 ||  || — || August 20, 2014 || Haleakala || Pan-STARRS ||  || align=right | 1.6 km || 
|-id=074 bgcolor=#E9E9E9
| 544074 ||  || — || December 1, 2010 || Mount Lemmon || Mount Lemmon Survey ||  || align=right | 1.2 km || 
|-id=075 bgcolor=#E9E9E9
| 544075 ||  || — || March 13, 2012 || Mount Lemmon || Mount Lemmon Survey ||  || align=right | 1.4 km || 
|-id=076 bgcolor=#d6d6d6
| 544076 ||  || — || February 26, 2012 || Haleakala || Pan-STARRS ||  || align=right | 2.5 km || 
|-id=077 bgcolor=#fefefe
| 544077 ||  || — || April 7, 2006 || Mount Lemmon || Mount Lemmon Survey ||  || align=right data-sort-value="0.68" | 680 m || 
|-id=078 bgcolor=#fefefe
| 544078 ||  || — || August 27, 2014 || Haleakala || Pan-STARRS ||  || align=right data-sort-value="0.71" | 710 m || 
|-id=079 bgcolor=#E9E9E9
| 544079 ||  || — || March 2, 2008 || Mount Lemmon || Mount Lemmon Survey ||  || align=right | 1.0 km || 
|-id=080 bgcolor=#fefefe
| 544080 ||  || — || November 17, 2011 || Kitt Peak || Spacewatch ||  || align=right data-sort-value="0.91" | 910 m || 
|-id=081 bgcolor=#E9E9E9
| 544081 ||  || — || February 3, 2012 || Mount Lemmon || Mount Lemmon Survey ||  || align=right data-sort-value="0.79" | 790 m || 
|-id=082 bgcolor=#fefefe
| 544082 ||  || — || December 29, 2011 || Mount Lemmon || Mount Lemmon Survey ||  || align=right data-sort-value="0.68" | 680 m || 
|-id=083 bgcolor=#fefefe
| 544083 ||  || — || August 28, 2014 || Haleakala || Pan-STARRS ||  || align=right data-sort-value="0.81" | 810 m || 
|-id=084 bgcolor=#fefefe
| 544084 ||  || — || March 2, 2009 || Mount Lemmon || Mount Lemmon Survey ||  || align=right data-sort-value="0.78" | 780 m || 
|-id=085 bgcolor=#fefefe
| 544085 ||  || — || May 15, 2013 || Haleakala || Pan-STARRS ||  || align=right data-sort-value="0.90" | 900 m || 
|-id=086 bgcolor=#E9E9E9
| 544086 ||  || — || October 17, 2010 || Mount Lemmon || Mount Lemmon Survey ||  || align=right | 1.8 km || 
|-id=087 bgcolor=#E9E9E9
| 544087 ||  || — || August 29, 2006 || Kitt Peak || Spacewatch ||  || align=right data-sort-value="0.80" | 800 m || 
|-id=088 bgcolor=#E9E9E9
| 544088 ||  || — || October 2, 2006 || Mount Lemmon || Mount Lemmon Survey ||  || align=right data-sort-value="0.94" | 940 m || 
|-id=089 bgcolor=#E9E9E9
| 544089 ||  || — || February 28, 2012 || Haleakala || Pan-STARRS ||  || align=right | 1.6 km || 
|-id=090 bgcolor=#fefefe
| 544090 ||  || — || January 2, 2009 || Kitt Peak || Spacewatch ||  || align=right data-sort-value="0.74" | 740 m || 
|-id=091 bgcolor=#E9E9E9
| 544091 ||  || — || December 17, 2007 || Mount Lemmon || Mount Lemmon Survey ||  || align=right data-sort-value="0.94" | 940 m || 
|-id=092 bgcolor=#E9E9E9
| 544092 ||  || — || July 25, 2006 || Mount Lemmon || Mount Lemmon Survey ||  || align=right data-sort-value="0.97" | 970 m || 
|-id=093 bgcolor=#fefefe
| 544093 ||  || — || November 20, 2007 || Mount Lemmon || Mount Lemmon Survey ||  || align=right data-sort-value="0.94" | 940 m || 
|-id=094 bgcolor=#d6d6d6
| 544094 ||  || — || February 26, 2012 || Kitt Peak || Spacewatch ||  || align=right | 2.5 km || 
|-id=095 bgcolor=#fefefe
| 544095 ||  || — || October 21, 2007 || Mount Lemmon || Mount Lemmon Survey ||  || align=right data-sort-value="0.98" | 980 m || 
|-id=096 bgcolor=#E9E9E9
| 544096 ||  || — || October 1, 2010 || Mount Lemmon || Mount Lemmon Survey ||  || align=right | 1.6 km || 
|-id=097 bgcolor=#fefefe
| 544097 ||  || — || December 17, 2007 || Mount Lemmon || Mount Lemmon Survey ||  || align=right data-sort-value="0.75" | 750 m || 
|-id=098 bgcolor=#E9E9E9
| 544098 ||  || — || July 30, 2005 || Palomar || NEAT ||  || align=right | 1.9 km || 
|-id=099 bgcolor=#E9E9E9
| 544099 ||  || — || August 28, 2014 || Haleakala || Pan-STARRS ||  || align=right | 1.2 km || 
|-id=100 bgcolor=#E9E9E9
| 544100 ||  || — || February 27, 2012 || Haleakala || Pan-STARRS ||  || align=right data-sort-value="0.77" | 770 m || 
|}

544101–544200 

|-bgcolor=#fefefe
| 544101 ||  || — || September 2, 2014 || Haleakala || Pan-STARRS ||  || align=right data-sort-value="0.69" | 690 m || 
|-id=102 bgcolor=#E9E9E9
| 544102 ||  || — || March 28, 2012 || Mount Lemmon || Mount Lemmon Survey ||  || align=right | 1.6 km || 
|-id=103 bgcolor=#fefefe
| 544103 ||  || — || February 20, 2009 || Mount Lemmon || Mount Lemmon Survey ||  || align=right data-sort-value="0.75" | 750 m || 
|-id=104 bgcolor=#E9E9E9
| 544104 ||  || — || December 14, 2010 || Mount Lemmon || Mount Lemmon Survey ||  || align=right | 1.8 km || 
|-id=105 bgcolor=#E9E9E9
| 544105 ||  || — || August 27, 2014 || Haleakala || Pan-STARRS ||  || align=right | 1.7 km || 
|-id=106 bgcolor=#E9E9E9
| 544106 ||  || — || October 27, 2006 || Mount Lemmon || Mount Lemmon Survey ||  || align=right data-sort-value="0.62" | 620 m || 
|-id=107 bgcolor=#E9E9E9
| 544107 ||  || — || September 18, 2014 || Haleakala || Pan-STARRS ||  || align=right | 1.9 km || 
|-id=108 bgcolor=#fefefe
| 544108 ||  || — || August 19, 2006 || Kitt Peak || Spacewatch ||  || align=right data-sort-value="0.68" | 680 m || 
|-id=109 bgcolor=#E9E9E9
| 544109 ||  || — || February 25, 1995 || Kitt Peak || Spacewatch ||  || align=right data-sort-value="0.72" | 720 m || 
|-id=110 bgcolor=#E9E9E9
| 544110 ||  || — || September 26, 2005 || Kitt Peak || Spacewatch ||  || align=right | 1.7 km || 
|-id=111 bgcolor=#E9E9E9
| 544111 ||  || — || November 1, 2005 || Kitt Peak || Spacewatch ||  || align=right | 2.1 km || 
|-id=112 bgcolor=#E9E9E9
| 544112 ||  || — || September 7, 2014 || Haleakala || Pan-STARRS ||  || align=right | 2.2 km || 
|-id=113 bgcolor=#fefefe
| 544113 ||  || — || June 7, 2013 || Haleakala || Pan-STARRS ||  || align=right data-sort-value="0.70" | 700 m || 
|-id=114 bgcolor=#E9E9E9
| 544114 ||  || — || October 3, 2006 || Mount Lemmon || Mount Lemmon Survey ||  || align=right data-sort-value="0.75" | 750 m || 
|-id=115 bgcolor=#E9E9E9
| 544115 ||  || — || February 9, 2003 || Haleakala || AMOS || BRG || align=right | 1.5 km || 
|-id=116 bgcolor=#E9E9E9
| 544116 ||  || — || September 19, 2014 || Cerro Tololo-LCO B || T. Lister ||  || align=right | 1.1 km || 
|-id=117 bgcolor=#E9E9E9
| 544117 ||  || — || November 12, 2010 || Mount Lemmon || Mount Lemmon Survey ||  || align=right | 1.5 km || 
|-id=118 bgcolor=#E9E9E9
| 544118 ||  || — || February 6, 2007 || Mount Lemmon || Mount Lemmon Survey ||  || align=right | 2.1 km || 
|-id=119 bgcolor=#d6d6d6
| 544119 ||  || — || February 12, 2011 || Mount Lemmon || Mount Lemmon Survey ||  || align=right | 3.3 km || 
|-id=120 bgcolor=#E9E9E9
| 544120 ||  || — || July 7, 2014 || Haleakala || Pan-STARRS ||  || align=right data-sort-value="0.93" | 930 m || 
|-id=121 bgcolor=#E9E9E9
| 544121 ||  || — || July 7, 2014 || Haleakala || Pan-STARRS ||  || align=right | 2.0 km || 
|-id=122 bgcolor=#E9E9E9
| 544122 ||  || — || March 29, 2008 || Kitt Peak || Spacewatch ||  || align=right | 2.3 km || 
|-id=123 bgcolor=#fefefe
| 544123 ||  || — || October 18, 2007 || Kitt Peak || Spacewatch ||  || align=right data-sort-value="0.78" | 780 m || 
|-id=124 bgcolor=#E9E9E9
| 544124 ||  || — || December 9, 2006 || Kitt Peak || Spacewatch ||  || align=right | 1.5 km || 
|-id=125 bgcolor=#E9E9E9
| 544125 ||  || — || September 15, 2009 || Mount Lemmon || Mount Lemmon Survey ||  || align=right | 1.9 km || 
|-id=126 bgcolor=#d6d6d6
| 544126 ||  || — || February 12, 2011 || Mount Lemmon || Mount Lemmon Survey ||  || align=right | 2.4 km || 
|-id=127 bgcolor=#d6d6d6
| 544127 ||  || — || September 20, 2014 || Mount Lemmon || Mount Lemmon Survey ||  || align=right | 2.9 km || 
|-id=128 bgcolor=#E9E9E9
| 544128 ||  || — || October 21, 2006 || Kitt Peak || Spacewatch ||  || align=right | 1.6 km || 
|-id=129 bgcolor=#fefefe
| 544129 ||  || — || October 4, 2010 || Mount Lemmon || Mount Lemmon Survey ||  || align=right data-sort-value="0.92" | 920 m || 
|-id=130 bgcolor=#fefefe
| 544130 ||  || — || December 18, 2003 || Kitt Peak || Spacewatch ||  || align=right data-sort-value="0.79" | 790 m || 
|-id=131 bgcolor=#E9E9E9
| 544131 ||  || — || August 29, 2014 || Haleakala || Pan-STARRS ||  || align=right | 1.0 km || 
|-id=132 bgcolor=#d6d6d6
| 544132 ||  || — || August 29, 2014 || Haleakala || Pan-STARRS ||  || align=right | 3.9 km || 
|-id=133 bgcolor=#E9E9E9
| 544133 ||  || — || October 20, 2006 || Mount Lemmon || Mount Lemmon Survey ||  || align=right | 1.9 km || 
|-id=134 bgcolor=#E9E9E9
| 544134 ||  || — || November 10, 2010 || Mount Lemmon || Mount Lemmon Survey ||  || align=right | 2.1 km || 
|-id=135 bgcolor=#E9E9E9
| 544135 ||  || — || September 5, 2010 || Mount Lemmon || Mount Lemmon Survey ||  || align=right | 1.2 km || 
|-id=136 bgcolor=#E9E9E9
| 544136 ||  || — || September 20, 2014 || Haleakala || Pan-STARRS ||  || align=right | 1.6 km || 
|-id=137 bgcolor=#fefefe
| 544137 ||  || — || September 21, 2003 || Kitt Peak || Spacewatch ||  || align=right | 1.2 km || 
|-id=138 bgcolor=#E9E9E9
| 544138 ||  || — || December 27, 2006 || Kitt Peak || Spacewatch ||  || align=right | 2.0 km || 
|-id=139 bgcolor=#E9E9E9
| 544139 ||  || — || October 11, 2006 || Palomar || NEAT ||  || align=right data-sort-value="0.79" | 790 m || 
|-id=140 bgcolor=#E9E9E9
| 544140 ||  || — || October 11, 2001 || Palomar || NEAT ||  || align=right | 1.8 km || 
|-id=141 bgcolor=#E9E9E9
| 544141 ||  || — || April 8, 2003 || Palomar || NEAT ||  || align=right | 2.4 km || 
|-id=142 bgcolor=#E9E9E9
| 544142 ||  || — || April 3, 2008 || Kitt Peak || Spacewatch ||  || align=right | 1.6 km || 
|-id=143 bgcolor=#E9E9E9
| 544143 ||  || — || October 6, 2005 || Kitt Peak || Spacewatch ||  || align=right | 2.1 km || 
|-id=144 bgcolor=#E9E9E9
| 544144 ||  || — || November 19, 2006 || Catalina || CSS ||  || align=right data-sort-value="0.85" | 850 m || 
|-id=145 bgcolor=#fefefe
| 544145 ||  || — || April 8, 2002 || Palomar || NEAT || NYS || align=right data-sort-value="0.73" | 730 m || 
|-id=146 bgcolor=#E9E9E9
| 544146 ||  || — || March 6, 2008 || Mount Lemmon || Mount Lemmon Survey ||  || align=right data-sort-value="0.94" | 940 m || 
|-id=147 bgcolor=#E9E9E9
| 544147 ||  || — || December 2, 2010 || Mount Lemmon || Mount Lemmon Survey ||  || align=right | 1.5 km || 
|-id=148 bgcolor=#E9E9E9
| 544148 ||  || — || November 1, 2010 || Mount Lemmon || Mount Lemmon Survey ||  || align=right | 1.3 km || 
|-id=149 bgcolor=#fefefe
| 544149 ||  || — || February 1, 2009 || Kitt Peak || Spacewatch ||  || align=right data-sort-value="0.71" | 710 m || 
|-id=150 bgcolor=#E9E9E9
| 544150 ||  || — || September 20, 2014 || Haleakala || Pan-STARRS ||  || align=right data-sort-value="0.83" | 830 m || 
|-id=151 bgcolor=#E9E9E9
| 544151 ||  || — || January 26, 2011 || Mount Lemmon || Mount Lemmon Survey ||  || align=right | 1.8 km || 
|-id=152 bgcolor=#d6d6d6
| 544152 ||  || — || September 20, 2014 || Haleakala || Pan-STARRS ||  || align=right | 2.2 km || 
|-id=153 bgcolor=#E9E9E9
| 544153 ||  || — || March 24, 2012 || Mount Lemmon || Mount Lemmon Survey ||  || align=right | 1.9 km || 
|-id=154 bgcolor=#d6d6d6
| 544154 ||  || — || September 4, 2014 || Haleakala || Pan-STARRS ||  || align=right | 2.9 km || 
|-id=155 bgcolor=#E9E9E9
| 544155 ||  || — || August 30, 2005 || Kitt Peak || Spacewatch ||  || align=right | 1.2 km || 
|-id=156 bgcolor=#d6d6d6
| 544156 ||  || — || March 13, 2011 || Mount Lemmon || Mount Lemmon Survey ||  || align=right | 2.5 km || 
|-id=157 bgcolor=#E9E9E9
| 544157 ||  || — || February 21, 2007 || Kitt Peak || Spacewatch ||  || align=right | 2.2 km || 
|-id=158 bgcolor=#d6d6d6
| 544158 ||  || — || September 20, 2014 || Haleakala || Pan-STARRS ||  || align=right | 2.2 km || 
|-id=159 bgcolor=#E9E9E9
| 544159 ||  || — || December 16, 2006 || Mount Lemmon || Mount Lemmon Survey ||  || align=right | 1.7 km || 
|-id=160 bgcolor=#E9E9E9
| 544160 ||  || — || November 19, 2006 || Catalina || CSS ||  || align=right | 1.4 km || 
|-id=161 bgcolor=#d6d6d6
| 544161 ||  || — || September 4, 2014 || Haleakala || Pan-STARRS ||  || align=right | 2.0 km || 
|-id=162 bgcolor=#d6d6d6
| 544162 ||  || — || March 13, 2011 || Kitt Peak || Spacewatch ||  || align=right | 2.6 km || 
|-id=163 bgcolor=#E9E9E9
| 544163 ||  || — || June 3, 2005 || Kitt Peak || Spacewatch ||  || align=right | 1.2 km || 
|-id=164 bgcolor=#E9E9E9
| 544164 ||  || — || September 12, 2005 || Kitt Peak || Spacewatch ||  || align=right | 1.8 km || 
|-id=165 bgcolor=#E9E9E9
| 544165 ||  || — || December 1, 2010 || Mount Lemmon || Mount Lemmon Survey ||  || align=right | 2.4 km || 
|-id=166 bgcolor=#E9E9E9
| 544166 ||  || — || May 30, 2005 || Siding Spring || SSS ||  || align=right | 1.7 km || 
|-id=167 bgcolor=#E9E9E9
| 544167 ||  || — || November 23, 1998 || Kitt Peak || Spacewatch ||  || align=right data-sort-value="0.98" | 980 m || 
|-id=168 bgcolor=#d6d6d6
| 544168 ||  || — || April 27, 2008 || Mount Lemmon || Mount Lemmon Survey ||  || align=right | 2.6 km || 
|-id=169 bgcolor=#E9E9E9
| 544169 ||  || — || September 27, 2006 || Catalina || CSS ||  || align=right data-sort-value="0.86" | 860 m || 
|-id=170 bgcolor=#E9E9E9
| 544170 ||  || — || October 28, 2010 || Kitt Peak || Spacewatch ||  || align=right | 2.0 km || 
|-id=171 bgcolor=#E9E9E9
| 544171 ||  || — || August 15, 2014 || Haleakala || Pan-STARRS ||  || align=right | 2.1 km || 
|-id=172 bgcolor=#fefefe
| 544172 ||  || — || October 21, 2011 || Mount Lemmon || Mount Lemmon Survey ||  || align=right data-sort-value="0.80" | 800 m || 
|-id=173 bgcolor=#E9E9E9
| 544173 ||  || — || February 3, 2012 || Haleakala || Pan-STARRS || MAR || align=right data-sort-value="0.83" | 830 m || 
|-id=174 bgcolor=#E9E9E9
| 544174 ||  || — || July 31, 2014 || Haleakala || Pan-STARRS ||  || align=right | 2.0 km || 
|-id=175 bgcolor=#fefefe
| 544175 ||  || — || December 6, 2011 || Haleakala || Pan-STARRS ||  || align=right data-sort-value="0.79" | 790 m || 
|-id=176 bgcolor=#fefefe
| 544176 ||  || — || November 30, 2003 || Kitt Peak || Spacewatch ||  || align=right data-sort-value="0.96" | 960 m || 
|-id=177 bgcolor=#d6d6d6
| 544177 ||  || — || April 30, 2008 || Mount Lemmon || Mount Lemmon Survey ||  || align=right | 2.7 km || 
|-id=178 bgcolor=#E9E9E9
| 544178 ||  || — || September 15, 2010 || Kitt Peak || Spacewatch ||  || align=right data-sort-value="0.71" | 710 m || 
|-id=179 bgcolor=#E9E9E9
| 544179 ||  || — || October 30, 2010 || Mount Lemmon || Mount Lemmon Survey ||  || align=right | 1.3 km || 
|-id=180 bgcolor=#E9E9E9
| 544180 ||  || — || September 14, 2014 || Catalina || CSS ||  || align=right | 1.7 km || 
|-id=181 bgcolor=#E9E9E9
| 544181 ||  || — || September 13, 2014 || Haleakala || Pan-STARRS ||  || align=right | 1.2 km || 
|-id=182 bgcolor=#E9E9E9
| 544182 ||  || — || July 20, 2001 || Palomar || NEAT ||  || align=right | 1.3 km || 
|-id=183 bgcolor=#E9E9E9
| 544183 ||  || — || July 13, 2009 || Kitt Peak || Spacewatch ||  || align=right | 2.3 km || 
|-id=184 bgcolor=#E9E9E9
| 544184 ||  || — || August 25, 2000 || Cerro Tololo || R. Millis, L. H. Wasserman ||  || align=right | 1.7 km || 
|-id=185 bgcolor=#E9E9E9
| 544185 ||  || — || September 23, 2014 || Mount Lemmon || Mount Lemmon Survey ||  || align=right | 1.4 km || 
|-id=186 bgcolor=#E9E9E9
| 544186 ||  || — || November 1, 2010 || Mount Lemmon || Mount Lemmon Survey ||  || align=right data-sort-value="0.77" | 770 m || 
|-id=187 bgcolor=#E9E9E9
| 544187 ||  || — || December 25, 2010 || Mount Lemmon || Mount Lemmon Survey ||  || align=right | 2.5 km || 
|-id=188 bgcolor=#E9E9E9
| 544188 ||  || — || January 19, 2012 || Haleakala || Pan-STARRS ||  || align=right data-sort-value="0.88" | 880 m || 
|-id=189 bgcolor=#d6d6d6
| 544189 ||  || — || June 14, 2013 || Mount Lemmon || Mount Lemmon Survey ||  || align=right | 3.1 km || 
|-id=190 bgcolor=#E9E9E9
| 544190 ||  || — || September 1, 2014 || Catalina || CSS ||  || align=right | 1.6 km || 
|-id=191 bgcolor=#E9E9E9
| 544191 ||  || — || October 29, 2005 || Palomar || NEAT ||  || align=right | 2.5 km || 
|-id=192 bgcolor=#E9E9E9
| 544192 ||  || — || January 1, 2012 || Mount Lemmon || Mount Lemmon Survey ||  || align=right | 1.5 km || 
|-id=193 bgcolor=#E9E9E9
| 544193 ||  || — || October 30, 2010 || Kitt Peak || Spacewatch || (5) || align=right data-sort-value="0.62" | 620 m || 
|-id=194 bgcolor=#d6d6d6
| 544194 ||  || — || November 22, 2005 || Kitt Peak || Spacewatch ||  || align=right | 2.8 km || 
|-id=195 bgcolor=#fefefe
| 544195 ||  || — || May 4, 2005 || Mount Lemmon || Mount Lemmon Survey ||  || align=right data-sort-value="0.96" | 960 m || 
|-id=196 bgcolor=#fefefe
| 544196 ||  || — || August 13, 2010 || Kitt Peak || Spacewatch ||  || align=right data-sort-value="0.74" | 740 m || 
|-id=197 bgcolor=#d6d6d6
| 544197 ||  || — || March 19, 2007 || Mount Lemmon || Mount Lemmon Survey ||  || align=right | 2.6 km || 
|-id=198 bgcolor=#E9E9E9
| 544198 ||  || — || March 16, 2012 || Mount Lemmon || Mount Lemmon Survey ||  || align=right data-sort-value="0.92" | 920 m || 
|-id=199 bgcolor=#fefefe
| 544199 ||  || — || March 15, 2013 || Mount Lemmon || Mount Lemmon Survey ||  || align=right | 1.1 km || 
|-id=200 bgcolor=#E9E9E9
| 544200 ||  || — || March 17, 2012 || Mount Lemmon || Mount Lemmon Survey ||  || align=right | 2.0 km || 
|}

544201–544300 

|-bgcolor=#E9E9E9
| 544201 ||  || — || September 27, 2006 || Mount Lemmon || Mount Lemmon Survey ||  || align=right | 1.0 km || 
|-id=202 bgcolor=#E9E9E9
| 544202 ||  || — || October 12, 2010 || Kitt Peak || Spacewatch ||  || align=right data-sort-value="0.73" | 730 m || 
|-id=203 bgcolor=#d6d6d6
| 544203 ||  || — || September 26, 2014 || Catalina || CSS ||  || align=right | 3.4 km || 
|-id=204 bgcolor=#d6d6d6
| 544204 ||  || — || September 26, 2014 || Catalina || CSS ||  || align=right | 2.4 km || 
|-id=205 bgcolor=#d6d6d6
| 544205 ||  || — || September 16, 2009 || Mount Lemmon || Mount Lemmon Survey ||  || align=right | 2.2 km || 
|-id=206 bgcolor=#E9E9E9
| 544206 ||  || — || January 28, 2007 || Mount Lemmon || Mount Lemmon Survey ||  || align=right | 2.2 km || 
|-id=207 bgcolor=#E9E9E9
| 544207 ||  || — || July 29, 2009 || Kitt Peak || Spacewatch ||  || align=right | 1.8 km || 
|-id=208 bgcolor=#E9E9E9
| 544208 ||  || — || January 26, 2011 || Mount Lemmon || Mount Lemmon Survey ||  || align=right | 1.8 km || 
|-id=209 bgcolor=#E9E9E9
| 544209 ||  || — || October 2, 2006 || Mount Lemmon || Mount Lemmon Survey ||  || align=right data-sort-value="0.82" | 820 m || 
|-id=210 bgcolor=#E9E9E9
| 544210 ||  || — || September 20, 2014 || Haleakala || Pan-STARRS ||  || align=right | 1.8 km || 
|-id=211 bgcolor=#d6d6d6
| 544211 ||  || — || August 24, 2003 || Palomar || NEAT ||  || align=right | 3.3 km || 
|-id=212 bgcolor=#E9E9E9
| 544212 ||  || — || November 13, 2010 || Mount Lemmon || Mount Lemmon Survey ||  || align=right | 1.2 km || 
|-id=213 bgcolor=#E9E9E9
| 544213 ||  || — || September 29, 2014 || Haleakala || Pan-STARRS ||  || align=right | 1.1 km || 
|-id=214 bgcolor=#E9E9E9
| 544214 ||  || — || February 25, 2007 || Mount Lemmon || Mount Lemmon Survey ||  || align=right | 2.1 km || 
|-id=215 bgcolor=#d6d6d6
| 544215 ||  || — || February 8, 2011 || Mount Lemmon || Mount Lemmon Survey ||  || align=right | 1.7 km || 
|-id=216 bgcolor=#d6d6d6
| 544216 ||  || — || September 22, 2014 || Haleakala || Pan-STARRS ||  || align=right | 2.2 km || 
|-id=217 bgcolor=#E9E9E9
| 544217 ||  || — || August 20, 2009 || Kitt Peak || Spacewatch ||  || align=right | 2.1 km || 
|-id=218 bgcolor=#E9E9E9
| 544218 ||  || — || May 5, 2008 || Kitt Peak || Spacewatch ||  || align=right | 2.3 km || 
|-id=219 bgcolor=#E9E9E9
| 544219 ||  || — || January 27, 2007 || Kitt Peak || Spacewatch ||  || align=right | 1.2 km || 
|-id=220 bgcolor=#E9E9E9
| 544220 ||  || — || November 6, 2010 || Kitt Peak || Spacewatch ||  || align=right | 1.1 km || 
|-id=221 bgcolor=#E9E9E9
| 544221 ||  || — || September 25, 2014 || Kitt Peak || Spacewatch ||  || align=right | 1.3 km || 
|-id=222 bgcolor=#E9E9E9
| 544222 ||  || — || September 29, 2014 || Haleakala || Pan-STARRS ||  || align=right | 1.8 km || 
|-id=223 bgcolor=#E9E9E9
| 544223 ||  || — || December 8, 2015 || Haleakala || Pan-STARRS ||  || align=right data-sort-value="0.92" | 920 m || 
|-id=224 bgcolor=#E9E9E9
| 544224 ||  || — || June 11, 2005 || Kitt Peak || Spacewatch ||  || align=right | 1.6 km || 
|-id=225 bgcolor=#d6d6d6
| 544225 ||  || — || October 1, 2014 || Catalina || CSS ||  || align=right | 2.7 km || 
|-id=226 bgcolor=#E9E9E9
| 544226 ||  || — || October 1, 2014 || Haleakala || Pan-STARRS ||  || align=right | 1.5 km || 
|-id=227 bgcolor=#E9E9E9
| 544227 ||  || — || January 21, 2002 || Kitt Peak || Spacewatch ||  || align=right | 2.0 km || 
|-id=228 bgcolor=#d6d6d6
| 544228 ||  || — || October 1, 2014 || Haleakala || Pan-STARRS ||  || align=right | 3.4 km || 
|-id=229 bgcolor=#d6d6d6
| 544229 ||  || — || October 1, 2014 || Haleakala || Pan-STARRS ||  || align=right | 3.5 km || 
|-id=230 bgcolor=#fefefe
| 544230 ||  || — || September 18, 2009 || Catalina || CSS || H || align=right data-sort-value="0.68" | 680 m || 
|-id=231 bgcolor=#d6d6d6
| 544231 ||  || — || October 27, 2009 || Mount Lemmon || Mount Lemmon Survey ||  || align=right | 2.7 km || 
|-id=232 bgcolor=#E9E9E9
| 544232 ||  || — || October 20, 2006 || Kitt Peak || Spacewatch ||  || align=right data-sort-value="0.77" | 770 m || 
|-id=233 bgcolor=#fefefe
| 544233 ||  || — || December 5, 1999 || Kitt Peak || Spacewatch ||  || align=right data-sort-value="0.66" | 660 m || 
|-id=234 bgcolor=#E9E9E9
| 544234 ||  || — || October 22, 2005 || Palomar || NEAT ||  || align=right | 2.2 km || 
|-id=235 bgcolor=#FA8072
| 544235 ||  || — || April 10, 2013 || Siding Spring || SSS ||  || align=right data-sort-value="0.59" | 590 m || 
|-id=236 bgcolor=#E9E9E9
| 544236 ||  || — || December 27, 2006 || Mount Lemmon || Mount Lemmon Survey ||  || align=right | 1.9 km || 
|-id=237 bgcolor=#E9E9E9
| 544237 ||  || — || September 23, 2001 || Palomar || NEAT ||  || align=right | 2.7 km || 
|-id=238 bgcolor=#E9E9E9
| 544238 ||  || — || July 20, 2001 || Palomar || NEAT ||  || align=right | 1.2 km || 
|-id=239 bgcolor=#E9E9E9
| 544239 ||  || — || November 11, 2010 || Mount Lemmon || Mount Lemmon Survey ||  || align=right data-sort-value="0.98" | 980 m || 
|-id=240 bgcolor=#d6d6d6
| 544240 ||  || — || September 15, 2004 || Kitt Peak || Spacewatch ||  || align=right | 1.8 km || 
|-id=241 bgcolor=#E9E9E9
| 544241 ||  || — || October 27, 2005 || Mount Lemmon || Mount Lemmon Survey ||  || align=right | 2.2 km || 
|-id=242 bgcolor=#E9E9E9
| 544242 ||  || — || November 13, 2010 || Kitt Peak || Spacewatch ||  || align=right | 1.2 km || 
|-id=243 bgcolor=#E9E9E9
| 544243 ||  || — || September 26, 2005 || Kitt Peak || Spacewatch ||  || align=right | 1.8 km || 
|-id=244 bgcolor=#E9E9E9
| 544244 ||  || — || March 16, 2012 || Mount Lemmon || Mount Lemmon Survey ||  || align=right | 2.5 km || 
|-id=245 bgcolor=#d6d6d6
| 544245 ||  || — || September 25, 2008 || Mount Lemmon || Mount Lemmon Survey ||  || align=right | 2.8 km || 
|-id=246 bgcolor=#E9E9E9
| 544246 ||  || — || February 21, 2007 || Kitt Peak || Spacewatch ||  || align=right | 1.8 km || 
|-id=247 bgcolor=#d6d6d6
| 544247 ||  || — || July 20, 2002 || Palomar || NEAT ||  || align=right | 3.7 km || 
|-id=248 bgcolor=#E9E9E9
| 544248 ||  || — || April 28, 2012 || Mount Lemmon || Mount Lemmon Survey ||  || align=right | 2.4 km || 
|-id=249 bgcolor=#fefefe
| 544249 ||  || — || April 12, 2013 || Haleakala || Pan-STARRS ||  || align=right data-sort-value="0.77" | 770 m || 
|-id=250 bgcolor=#E9E9E9
| 544250 ||  || — || September 1, 2005 || Kitt Peak || Spacewatch ||  || align=right | 1.6 km || 
|-id=251 bgcolor=#E9E9E9
| 544251 ||  || — || October 1, 2014 || Catalina || CSS ||  || align=right | 1.5 km || 
|-id=252 bgcolor=#E9E9E9
| 544252 ||  || — || February 19, 2012 || Kitt Peak || Spacewatch ||  || align=right | 2.6 km || 
|-id=253 bgcolor=#d6d6d6
| 544253 ||  || — || September 25, 2009 || Mount Lemmon || Mount Lemmon Survey ||  || align=right | 3.2 km || 
|-id=254 bgcolor=#E9E9E9
| 544254 ||  || — || September 24, 2014 || Mount Lemmon || Mount Lemmon Survey ||  || align=right | 1.1 km || 
|-id=255 bgcolor=#E9E9E9
| 544255 ||  || — || June 23, 2009 || Siding Spring || SSS ||  || align=right | 1.2 km || 
|-id=256 bgcolor=#fefefe
| 544256 ||  || — || March 26, 2006 || Kitt Peak || Spacewatch ||  || align=right data-sort-value="0.65" | 650 m || 
|-id=257 bgcolor=#E9E9E9
| 544257 ||  || — || January 10, 2007 || Mount Lemmon || Mount Lemmon Survey ||  || align=right | 1.4 km || 
|-id=258 bgcolor=#E9E9E9
| 544258 ||  || — || October 29, 2005 || Kitt Peak || Spacewatch ||  || align=right | 2.2 km || 
|-id=259 bgcolor=#E9E9E9
| 544259 ||  || — || July 18, 2001 || Palomar || NEAT ||  || align=right | 1.2 km || 
|-id=260 bgcolor=#d6d6d6
| 544260 ||  || — || October 15, 2009 || Mount Lemmon || Mount Lemmon Survey ||  || align=right | 2.3 km || 
|-id=261 bgcolor=#E9E9E9
| 544261 ||  || — || July 14, 2001 || Palomar || NEAT ||  || align=right | 1.8 km || 
|-id=262 bgcolor=#E9E9E9
| 544262 ||  || — || May 15, 2009 || Kitt Peak || Spacewatch ||  || align=right data-sort-value="0.87" | 870 m || 
|-id=263 bgcolor=#E9E9E9
| 544263 ||  || — || June 30, 2014 || Haleakala || Pan-STARRS ||  || align=right | 1.8 km || 
|-id=264 bgcolor=#fefefe
| 544264 ||  || — || October 4, 2014 || Haleakala || Pan-STARRS || H || align=right data-sort-value="0.79" | 790 m || 
|-id=265 bgcolor=#fefefe
| 544265 ||  || — || March 4, 2013 || Haleakala || Pan-STARRS || H || align=right data-sort-value="0.47" | 470 m || 
|-id=266 bgcolor=#E9E9E9
| 544266 ||  || — || September 25, 2005 || Apache Point || SDSS Collaboration ||  || align=right | 1.2 km || 
|-id=267 bgcolor=#d6d6d6
| 544267 ||  || — || April 17, 2005 || Kitt Peak || Spacewatch ||  || align=right | 3.2 km || 
|-id=268 bgcolor=#d6d6d6
| 544268 ||  || — || October 6, 2013 || Catalina || CSS ||  || align=right | 3.5 km || 
|-id=269 bgcolor=#d6d6d6
| 544269 ||  || — || June 18, 2013 || Haleakala || Pan-STARRS ||  || align=right | 2.5 km || 
|-id=270 bgcolor=#E9E9E9
| 544270 ||  || — || October 2, 2014 || Haleakala || Pan-STARRS ||  || align=right | 1.6 km || 
|-id=271 bgcolor=#d6d6d6
| 544271 ||  || — || October 3, 2014 || Mount Lemmon || Mount Lemmon Survey ||  || align=right | 2.1 km || 
|-id=272 bgcolor=#E9E9E9
| 544272 ||  || — || March 11, 2007 || Mount Lemmon || Mount Lemmon Survey ||  || align=right | 2.0 km || 
|-id=273 bgcolor=#E9E9E9
| 544273 ||  || — || March 21, 2012 || Mount Lemmon || Mount Lemmon Survey ||  || align=right | 1.3 km || 
|-id=274 bgcolor=#E9E9E9
| 544274 ||  || — || October 4, 2014 || Haleakala || Pan-STARRS ||  || align=right | 2.0 km || 
|-id=275 bgcolor=#d6d6d6
| 544275 ||  || — || March 29, 2012 || Kitt Peak || Spacewatch ||  || align=right | 2.4 km || 
|-id=276 bgcolor=#E9E9E9
| 544276 ||  || — || April 5, 2008 || Mount Lemmon || Mount Lemmon Survey ||  || align=right | 1.3 km || 
|-id=277 bgcolor=#d6d6d6
| 544277 ||  || — || November 18, 2003 || Kitt Peak || Spacewatch ||  || align=right | 3.2 km || 
|-id=278 bgcolor=#d6d6d6
| 544278 ||  || — || October 3, 2014 || Mount Lemmon || Mount Lemmon Survey ||  || align=right | 2.3 km || 
|-id=279 bgcolor=#d6d6d6
| 544279 ||  || — || September 16, 2003 || Kitt Peak || Spacewatch ||  || align=right | 2.3 km || 
|-id=280 bgcolor=#d6d6d6
| 544280 ||  || — || August 23, 2008 || Siding Spring || SSS ||  || align=right | 3.0 km || 
|-id=281 bgcolor=#d6d6d6
| 544281 ||  || — || October 3, 2014 || Mount Lemmon || Mount Lemmon Survey ||  || align=right | 2.1 km || 
|-id=282 bgcolor=#E9E9E9
| 544282 ||  || — || December 1, 2005 || Kitt Peak || Spacewatch ||  || align=right | 1.9 km || 
|-id=283 bgcolor=#E9E9E9
| 544283 ||  || — || October 17, 2014 || Kitt Peak || Spacewatch ||  || align=right | 1.5 km || 
|-id=284 bgcolor=#E9E9E9
| 544284 ||  || — || August 29, 2005 || Palomar || NEAT ||  || align=right | 1.7 km || 
|-id=285 bgcolor=#E9E9E9
| 544285 ||  || — || February 14, 2012 || Haleakala || Pan-STARRS ||  || align=right | 1.8 km || 
|-id=286 bgcolor=#E9E9E9
| 544286 ||  || — || January 25, 2007 || Kitt Peak || Spacewatch ||  || align=right | 1.3 km || 
|-id=287 bgcolor=#E9E9E9
| 544287 ||  || — || February 22, 2003 || Palomar || NEAT ||  || align=right | 1.9 km || 
|-id=288 bgcolor=#E9E9E9
| 544288 ||  || — || October 22, 2005 || Kitt Peak || Spacewatch ||  || align=right | 2.3 km || 
|-id=289 bgcolor=#E9E9E9
| 544289 ||  || — || January 13, 2011 || Kitt Peak || Spacewatch ||  || align=right | 1.7 km || 
|-id=290 bgcolor=#E9E9E9
| 544290 ||  || — || May 14, 2013 || Nogales || M. Schwartz, P. R. Holvorcem ||  || align=right | 1.8 km || 
|-id=291 bgcolor=#E9E9E9
| 544291 ||  || — || September 16, 2009 || Catalina || CSS ||  || align=right | 2.1 km || 
|-id=292 bgcolor=#E9E9E9
| 544292 ||  || — || September 20, 2014 || Haleakala || Pan-STARRS ||  || align=right | 1.1 km || 
|-id=293 bgcolor=#E9E9E9
| 544293 ||  || — || August 31, 2014 || Haleakala || Pan-STARRS ||  || align=right | 1.8 km || 
|-id=294 bgcolor=#E9E9E9
| 544294 ||  || — || December 13, 2010 || Mount Lemmon || Mount Lemmon Survey ||  || align=right | 1.2 km || 
|-id=295 bgcolor=#d6d6d6
| 544295 ||  || — || August 28, 2008 || Hibiscus || N. Teamo, S. F. Hönig ||  || align=right | 2.7 km || 
|-id=296 bgcolor=#E9E9E9
| 544296 ||  || — || September 26, 2005 || Kitt Peak || Spacewatch ||  || align=right | 1.7 km || 
|-id=297 bgcolor=#E9E9E9
| 544297 ||  || — || October 23, 2014 || Nogales || M. Schwartz, P. R. Holvorcem ||  || align=right | 1.8 km || 
|-id=298 bgcolor=#d6d6d6
| 544298 ||  || — || December 10, 2004 || Kitt Peak || Spacewatch ||  || align=right | 2.3 km || 
|-id=299 bgcolor=#E9E9E9
| 544299 ||  || — || October 13, 2010 || Mount Lemmon || Mount Lemmon Survey ||  || align=right data-sort-value="0.78" | 780 m || 
|-id=300 bgcolor=#E9E9E9
| 544300 ||  || — || October 7, 2005 || Kitt Peak || Spacewatch ||  || align=right | 1.6 km || 
|}

544301–544400 

|-bgcolor=#E9E9E9
| 544301 ||  || — || October 26, 2005 || Kitt Peak || Spacewatch ||  || align=right | 1.8 km || 
|-id=302 bgcolor=#E9E9E9
| 544302 ||  || — || March 10, 2008 || Catalina || CSS ||  || align=right | 1.2 km || 
|-id=303 bgcolor=#d6d6d6
| 544303 ||  || — || October 21, 2014 || Kitt Peak || Spacewatch ||  || align=right | 2.5 km || 
|-id=304 bgcolor=#E9E9E9
| 544304 ||  || — || November 16, 2009 || Kitt Peak || Spacewatch ||  || align=right | 2.4 km || 
|-id=305 bgcolor=#E9E9E9
| 544305 ||  || — || March 26, 2007 || Kitt Peak || Spacewatch ||  || align=right | 1.5 km || 
|-id=306 bgcolor=#E9E9E9
| 544306 ||  || — || December 10, 2010 || Kitt Peak || Spacewatch ||  || align=right | 1.4 km || 
|-id=307 bgcolor=#E9E9E9
| 544307 ||  || — || October 21, 2006 || Lulin || LUSS ||  || align=right | 1.0 km || 
|-id=308 bgcolor=#E9E9E9
| 544308 ||  || — || November 27, 2010 || Mount Lemmon || Mount Lemmon Survey ||  || align=right | 1.5 km || 
|-id=309 bgcolor=#d6d6d6
| 544309 ||  || — || October 20, 2014 || Piszkesteto || K. Sárneczky ||  || align=right | 3.4 km || 
|-id=310 bgcolor=#E9E9E9
| 544310 ||  || — || September 16, 2009 || Mount Lemmon || Mount Lemmon Survey ||  || align=right | 1.8 km || 
|-id=311 bgcolor=#E9E9E9
| 544311 ||  || — || November 6, 2005 || Mount Lemmon || Mount Lemmon Survey ||  || align=right | 2.0 km || 
|-id=312 bgcolor=#E9E9E9
| 544312 ||  || — || April 15, 2008 || Kitt Peak || Spacewatch ||  || align=right | 1.7 km || 
|-id=313 bgcolor=#d6d6d6
| 544313 ||  || — || June 30, 2008 || Kitt Peak || Spacewatch ||  || align=right | 2.4 km || 
|-id=314 bgcolor=#E9E9E9
| 544314 ||  || — || October 21, 2014 || Kitt Peak || Spacewatch ||  || align=right | 1.2 km || 
|-id=315 bgcolor=#d6d6d6
| 544315 ||  || — || October 14, 2009 || Kitt Peak || Spacewatch ||  || align=right | 2.9 km || 
|-id=316 bgcolor=#E9E9E9
| 544316 ||  || — || September 30, 2005 || Mount Lemmon || Mount Lemmon Survey ||  || align=right | 2.1 km || 
|-id=317 bgcolor=#d6d6d6
| 544317 ||  || — || March 26, 2007 || Mount Lemmon || Mount Lemmon Survey ||  || align=right | 2.5 km || 
|-id=318 bgcolor=#E9E9E9
| 544318 ||  || — || April 25, 2003 || Kitt Peak || Spacewatch ||  || align=right | 1.5 km || 
|-id=319 bgcolor=#d6d6d6
| 544319 ||  || — || October 3, 2014 || Mount Lemmon || Mount Lemmon Survey ||  || align=right | 2.1 km || 
|-id=320 bgcolor=#E9E9E9
| 544320 ||  || — || September 23, 2005 || Kitt Peak || Spacewatch ||  || align=right | 1.2 km || 
|-id=321 bgcolor=#E9E9E9
| 544321 ||  || — || December 5, 2010 || Kitt Peak || Spacewatch ||  || align=right | 1.1 km || 
|-id=322 bgcolor=#E9E9E9
| 544322 ||  || — || May 24, 2001 || Cerro Tololo || J. L. Elliot, L. H. Wasserman ||  || align=right data-sort-value="0.77" | 770 m || 
|-id=323 bgcolor=#E9E9E9
| 544323 ||  || — || November 8, 2010 || Mount Lemmon || Mount Lemmon Survey ||  || align=right | 1.3 km || 
|-id=324 bgcolor=#FA8072
| 544324 ||  || — || May 23, 2006 || Kitt Peak || Spacewatch ||  || align=right data-sort-value="0.51" | 510 m || 
|-id=325 bgcolor=#E9E9E9
| 544325 Péczbéla ||  ||  || December 4, 2010 || Piszkesteto || K. Sárneczky, Z. Kuli ||  || align=right | 1.1 km || 
|-id=326 bgcolor=#E9E9E9
| 544326 ||  || — || August 10, 2005 || Cerro Tololo || Cerro Tololo Obs. ||  || align=right | 1.6 km || 
|-id=327 bgcolor=#E9E9E9
| 544327 ||  || — || October 30, 2005 || Mount Lemmon || Mount Lemmon Survey ||  || align=right | 1.2 km || 
|-id=328 bgcolor=#E9E9E9
| 544328 ||  || — || August 27, 2009 || Catalina || CSS ||  || align=right | 1.9 km || 
|-id=329 bgcolor=#E9E9E9
| 544329 ||  || — || September 30, 2006 || Kitt Peak || Spacewatch ||  || align=right | 1.6 km || 
|-id=330 bgcolor=#E9E9E9
| 544330 ||  || — || July 28, 2009 || Kitt Peak || Spacewatch ||  || align=right | 1.7 km || 
|-id=331 bgcolor=#d6d6d6
| 544331 ||  || — || August 27, 2009 || Kitt Peak || Spacewatch ||  || align=right | 2.2 km || 
|-id=332 bgcolor=#E9E9E9
| 544332 ||  || — || February 26, 2007 || Mount Lemmon || Mount Lemmon Survey ||  || align=right | 2.3 km || 
|-id=333 bgcolor=#E9E9E9
| 544333 ||  || — || October 1, 2005 || Mount Lemmon || Mount Lemmon Survey ||  || align=right | 1.8 km || 
|-id=334 bgcolor=#E9E9E9
| 544334 ||  || — || October 17, 2010 || Mount Lemmon || Mount Lemmon Survey ||  || align=right data-sort-value="0.78" | 780 m || 
|-id=335 bgcolor=#d6d6d6
| 544335 ||  || — || November 8, 2009 || Mount Lemmon || Mount Lemmon Survey ||  || align=right | 2.6 km || 
|-id=336 bgcolor=#E9E9E9
| 544336 ||  || — || September 17, 2009 || Mount Lemmon || Mount Lemmon Survey ||  || align=right | 1.7 km || 
|-id=337 bgcolor=#E9E9E9
| 544337 ||  || — || March 10, 2003 || Palomar || NEAT || (5) || align=right data-sort-value="0.99" | 990 m || 
|-id=338 bgcolor=#d6d6d6
| 544338 ||  || — || September 20, 2003 || Palomar || NEAT ||  || align=right | 2.1 km || 
|-id=339 bgcolor=#E9E9E9
| 544339 ||  || — || February 14, 2004 || Kitt Peak || Spacewatch ||  || align=right | 1.3 km || 
|-id=340 bgcolor=#d6d6d6
| 544340 ||  || — || October 25, 2014 || Haleakala || Pan-STARRS ||  || align=right | 2.3 km || 
|-id=341 bgcolor=#E9E9E9
| 544341 ||  || — || October 25, 2005 || Mount Lemmon || Mount Lemmon Survey || EUN || align=right | 1.1 km || 
|-id=342 bgcolor=#E9E9E9
| 544342 ||  || — || January 4, 2006 || Catalina || CSS ||  || align=right | 3.6 km || 
|-id=343 bgcolor=#d6d6d6
| 544343 ||  || — || February 5, 2011 || Haleakala || Pan-STARRS ||  || align=right | 2.4 km || 
|-id=344 bgcolor=#d6d6d6
| 544344 ||  || — || October 2, 2014 || Haleakala || Pan-STARRS ||  || align=right | 3.4 km || 
|-id=345 bgcolor=#E9E9E9
| 544345 ||  || — || August 29, 2005 || Bergisch Gladbach || W. Bickel ||  || align=right | 1.8 km || 
|-id=346 bgcolor=#E9E9E9
| 544346 ||  || — || January 20, 2008 || Mount Lemmon || Mount Lemmon Survey ||  || align=right | 1.3 km || 
|-id=347 bgcolor=#E9E9E9
| 544347 ||  || — || October 3, 2014 || Mount Lemmon || Mount Lemmon Survey ||  || align=right | 1.3 km || 
|-id=348 bgcolor=#E9E9E9
| 544348 ||  || — || October 22, 2014 || Mount Lemmon || Mount Lemmon Survey ||  || align=right | 2.4 km || 
|-id=349 bgcolor=#E9E9E9
| 544349 ||  || — || October 22, 2014 || Mount Lemmon || Mount Lemmon Survey ||  || align=right | 1.7 km || 
|-id=350 bgcolor=#E9E9E9
| 544350 ||  || — || February 26, 2012 || Mount Lemmon || Mount Lemmon Survey ||  || align=right | 1.5 km || 
|-id=351 bgcolor=#d6d6d6
| 544351 ||  || — || October 22, 2014 || Mount Lemmon || Mount Lemmon Survey ||  || align=right | 3.2 km || 
|-id=352 bgcolor=#E9E9E9
| 544352 ||  || — || August 19, 2009 || Bergisch Gladbach || W. Bickel ||  || align=right | 2.0 km || 
|-id=353 bgcolor=#E9E9E9
| 544353 ||  || — || January 27, 2007 || Kitt Peak || Spacewatch ||  || align=right | 1.3 km || 
|-id=354 bgcolor=#d6d6d6
| 544354 ||  || — || June 2, 2008 || Mount Lemmon || Mount Lemmon Survey ||  || align=right | 3.8 km || 
|-id=355 bgcolor=#E9E9E9
| 544355 ||  || — || March 28, 2012 || Mount Lemmon || Mount Lemmon Survey ||  || align=right | 1.1 km || 
|-id=356 bgcolor=#d6d6d6
| 544356 ||  || — || March 27, 2011 || Mount Lemmon || Mount Lemmon Survey ||  || align=right | 2.4 km || 
|-id=357 bgcolor=#E9E9E9
| 544357 ||  || — || June 18, 2013 || Haleakala || Pan-STARRS ||  || align=right | 1.1 km || 
|-id=358 bgcolor=#E9E9E9
| 544358 ||  || — || October 25, 2005 || Mount Lemmon || Mount Lemmon Survey ||  || align=right | 2.0 km || 
|-id=359 bgcolor=#E9E9E9
| 544359 ||  || — || October 3, 2014 || Mount Lemmon || Mount Lemmon Survey ||  || align=right data-sort-value="0.98" | 980 m || 
|-id=360 bgcolor=#E9E9E9
| 544360 ||  || — || October 17, 2014 || Kitt Peak || Spacewatch ||  || align=right | 1.1 km || 
|-id=361 bgcolor=#d6d6d6
| 544361 ||  || — || September 30, 2009 || Mount Lemmon || Mount Lemmon Survey ||  || align=right | 2.0 km || 
|-id=362 bgcolor=#d6d6d6
| 544362 ||  || — || November 9, 2009 || Mount Lemmon || Mount Lemmon Survey ||  || align=right | 2.7 km || 
|-id=363 bgcolor=#E9E9E9
| 544363 ||  || — || October 17, 2014 || Kitt Peak || Spacewatch ||  || align=right | 1.2 km || 
|-id=364 bgcolor=#d6d6d6
| 544364 ||  || — || October 25, 2014 || Kitt Peak || Spacewatch ||  || align=right | 2.1 km || 
|-id=365 bgcolor=#E9E9E9
| 544365 ||  || — || July 15, 2005 || Kitt Peak || Spacewatch ||  || align=right data-sort-value="0.87" | 870 m || 
|-id=366 bgcolor=#E9E9E9
| 544366 ||  || — || April 20, 2004 || Kitt Peak || Spacewatch ||  || align=right | 1.7 km || 
|-id=367 bgcolor=#E9E9E9
| 544367 ||  || — || October 25, 2014 || Mount Lemmon || Mount Lemmon Survey ||  || align=right data-sort-value="0.73" | 730 m || 
|-id=368 bgcolor=#E9E9E9
| 544368 ||  || — || October 21, 2006 || Mount Lemmon || Mount Lemmon Survey ||  || align=right | 1.0 km || 
|-id=369 bgcolor=#E9E9E9
| 544369 ||  || — || November 6, 2010 || Mount Lemmon || Mount Lemmon Survey || (5) || align=right data-sort-value="0.65" | 650 m || 
|-id=370 bgcolor=#E9E9E9
| 544370 ||  || — || April 21, 2009 || Mount Lemmon || Mount Lemmon Survey ||  || align=right | 1.0 km || 
|-id=371 bgcolor=#E9E9E9
| 544371 ||  || — || August 18, 2009 || Kitt Peak || Spacewatch ||  || align=right | 2.2 km || 
|-id=372 bgcolor=#E9E9E9
| 544372 ||  || — || August 29, 2005 || Kitt Peak || Spacewatch ||  || align=right | 1.3 km || 
|-id=373 bgcolor=#d6d6d6
| 544373 ||  || — || October 20, 2003 || Palomar || NEAT ||  || align=right | 3.4 km || 
|-id=374 bgcolor=#E9E9E9
| 544374 ||  || — || October 25, 2014 || Kitt Peak || Spacewatch ||  || align=right | 1.3 km || 
|-id=375 bgcolor=#E9E9E9
| 544375 ||  || — || August 10, 2005 || Cerro Tololo || Cerro Tololo Obs. ||  || align=right | 1.3 km || 
|-id=376 bgcolor=#E9E9E9
| 544376 ||  || — || October 25, 2014 || Haleakala || Pan-STARRS ||  || align=right | 1.8 km || 
|-id=377 bgcolor=#E9E9E9
| 544377 ||  || — || October 25, 2014 || Haleakala || Pan-STARRS ||  || align=right | 1.5 km || 
|-id=378 bgcolor=#d6d6d6
| 544378 ||  || — || October 25, 2014 || Haleakala || Pan-STARRS ||  || align=right | 1.9 km || 
|-id=379 bgcolor=#E9E9E9
| 544379 ||  || — || October 25, 2014 || Haleakala || Pan-STARRS ||  || align=right | 1.3 km || 
|-id=380 bgcolor=#d6d6d6
| 544380 ||  || — || November 23, 2009 || Kitt Peak || Spacewatch ||  || align=right | 2.0 km || 
|-id=381 bgcolor=#E9E9E9
| 544381 ||  || — || September 16, 2009 || Mount Lemmon || Mount Lemmon Survey ||  || align=right | 1.7 km || 
|-id=382 bgcolor=#E9E9E9
| 544382 ||  || — || September 21, 2001 || Kitt Peak || Spacewatch ||  || align=right | 1.8 km || 
|-id=383 bgcolor=#E9E9E9
| 544383 ||  || — || October 26, 2014 || Mount Lemmon || Mount Lemmon Survey ||  || align=right | 1.5 km || 
|-id=384 bgcolor=#fefefe
| 544384 ||  || — || December 5, 2010 || Mount Lemmon || Mount Lemmon Survey ||  || align=right | 1.0 km || 
|-id=385 bgcolor=#E9E9E9
| 544385 ||  || — || July 15, 2013 || Haleakala || Pan-STARRS ||  || align=right | 2.6 km || 
|-id=386 bgcolor=#d6d6d6
| 544386 ||  || — || September 27, 2003 || Kitt Peak || Spacewatch ||  || align=right | 3.4 km || 
|-id=387 bgcolor=#E9E9E9
| 544387 ||  || — || October 28, 2014 || Mount Lemmon || Mount Lemmon Survey ||  || align=right data-sort-value="0.86" | 860 m || 
|-id=388 bgcolor=#E9E9E9
| 544388 ||  || — || September 1, 2005 || Kitt Peak || Spacewatch ||  || align=right | 1.1 km || 
|-id=389 bgcolor=#d6d6d6
| 544389 ||  || — || July 15, 2013 || Mauna Kea || Mauna Kea Obs. ||  || align=right | 2.5 km || 
|-id=390 bgcolor=#E9E9E9
| 544390 ||  || — || October 28, 2014 || Mount Lemmon || Mount Lemmon Survey ||  || align=right | 1.5 km || 
|-id=391 bgcolor=#d6d6d6
| 544391 ||  || — || September 25, 2014 || Kitt Peak || Spacewatch ||  || align=right | 2.8 km || 
|-id=392 bgcolor=#E9E9E9
| 544392 ||  || — || October 25, 2014 || Mount Lemmon || Mount Lemmon Survey ||  || align=right | 1.4 km || 
|-id=393 bgcolor=#E9E9E9
| 544393 ||  || — || April 27, 2012 || Haleakala || Pan-STARRS ||  || align=right | 1.2 km || 
|-id=394 bgcolor=#E9E9E9
| 544394 ||  || — || October 22, 2006 || Kitt Peak || Spacewatch ||  || align=right data-sort-value="0.93" | 930 m || 
|-id=395 bgcolor=#E9E9E9
| 544395 ||  || — || August 23, 2014 || Haleakala || Pan-STARRS ||  || align=right | 1.4 km || 
|-id=396 bgcolor=#d6d6d6
| 544396 ||  || — || October 14, 2004 || Palomar || NEAT ||  || align=right | 3.7 km || 
|-id=397 bgcolor=#E9E9E9
| 544397 ||  || — || October 3, 2014 || Mount Lemmon || Mount Lemmon Survey ||  || align=right | 1.3 km || 
|-id=398 bgcolor=#fefefe
| 544398 ||  || — || May 27, 2009 || Mount Lemmon || Mount Lemmon Survey ||  || align=right data-sort-value="0.87" | 870 m || 
|-id=399 bgcolor=#E9E9E9
| 544399 ||  || — || August 30, 2005 || Kitt Peak || Spacewatch ||  || align=right | 1.2 km || 
|-id=400 bgcolor=#d6d6d6
| 544400 ||  || — || October 7, 2008 || Mount Lemmon || Mount Lemmon Survey ||  || align=right | 3.4 km || 
|}

544401–544500 

|-bgcolor=#d6d6d6
| 544401 ||  || — || October 10, 2008 || Mount Lemmon || Mount Lemmon Survey ||  || align=right | 3.9 km || 
|-id=402 bgcolor=#E9E9E9
| 544402 ||  || — || October 27, 2014 || Haleakala || Pan-STARRS ||  || align=right | 1.3 km || 
|-id=403 bgcolor=#E9E9E9
| 544403 ||  || — || November 5, 2010 || Kitt Peak || Spacewatch ||  || align=right | 1.5 km || 
|-id=404 bgcolor=#d6d6d6
| 544404 ||  || — || July 2, 2013 || Haleakala || Pan-STARRS ||  || align=right | 2.5 km || 
|-id=405 bgcolor=#E9E9E9
| 544405 ||  || — || December 1, 1996 || Kitt Peak || Spacewatch ||  || align=right | 1.7 km || 
|-id=406 bgcolor=#d6d6d6
| 544406 ||  || — || October 18, 2014 || Nogales || M. Schwartz, P. R. Holvorcem ||  || align=right | 3.2 km || 
|-id=407 bgcolor=#E9E9E9
| 544407 ||  || — || October 27, 2005 || Palomar || NEAT || NEM || align=right | 2.5 km || 
|-id=408 bgcolor=#E9E9E9
| 544408 ||  || — || November 12, 2010 || Kitt Peak || Spacewatch ||  || align=right | 1.5 km || 
|-id=409 bgcolor=#E9E9E9
| 544409 ||  || — || September 4, 2014 || Haleakala || Pan-STARRS ||  || align=right | 1.8 km || 
|-id=410 bgcolor=#d6d6d6
| 544410 ||  || — || December 11, 2009 || Mount Lemmon || Mount Lemmon Survey ||  || align=right | 1.9 km || 
|-id=411 bgcolor=#E9E9E9
| 544411 ||  || — || February 20, 2012 || Haleakala || Pan-STARRS ||  || align=right | 1.6 km || 
|-id=412 bgcolor=#E9E9E9
| 544412 ||  || — || October 28, 2006 || Catalina || CSS ||  || align=right data-sort-value="0.94" | 940 m || 
|-id=413 bgcolor=#d6d6d6
| 544413 ||  || — || July 24, 2003 || Palomar || NEAT ||  || align=right | 3.2 km || 
|-id=414 bgcolor=#E9E9E9
| 544414 ||  || — || August 30, 2014 || La Sagra || OAM Obs. ||  || align=right | 1.5 km || 
|-id=415 bgcolor=#E9E9E9
| 544415 ||  || — || October 28, 2014 || Haleakala || Pan-STARRS ||  || align=right | 1.6 km || 
|-id=416 bgcolor=#E9E9E9
| 544416 ||  || — || December 4, 2010 || Mount Lemmon || Mount Lemmon Survey ||  || align=right | 2.8 km || 
|-id=417 bgcolor=#d6d6d6
| 544417 ||  || — || December 11, 2009 || Tzec Maun || D. Chestnov, A. Novichonok ||  || align=right | 4.4 km || 
|-id=418 bgcolor=#d6d6d6
| 544418 ||  || — || April 17, 2012 || Kitt Peak || Spacewatch ||  || align=right | 3.6 km || 
|-id=419 bgcolor=#d6d6d6
| 544419 ||  || — || September 25, 2014 || Catalina || CSS ||  || align=right | 2.6 km || 
|-id=420 bgcolor=#E9E9E9
| 544420 ||  || — || January 27, 2012 || Kitt Peak || Spacewatch ||  || align=right | 1.2 km || 
|-id=421 bgcolor=#E9E9E9
| 544421 ||  || — || September 1, 2005 || Palomar || NEAT ||  || align=right | 1.7 km || 
|-id=422 bgcolor=#E9E9E9
| 544422 ||  || — || August 5, 2005 || Palomar || NEAT ||  || align=right | 1.6 km || 
|-id=423 bgcolor=#E9E9E9
| 544423 ||  || — || August 30, 2014 || Mount Lemmon || Mount Lemmon Survey ||  || align=right | 1.9 km || 
|-id=424 bgcolor=#E9E9E9
| 544424 ||  || — || August 25, 2005 || Campo Imperatore || A. Boattini ||  || align=right | 2.0 km || 
|-id=425 bgcolor=#d6d6d6
| 544425 ||  || — || February 7, 2011 || Mount Lemmon || Mount Lemmon Survey ||  || align=right | 2.6 km || 
|-id=426 bgcolor=#d6d6d6
| 544426 ||  || — || October 14, 2009 || Catalina || CSS ||  || align=right | 3.2 km || 
|-id=427 bgcolor=#d6d6d6
| 544427 ||  || — || September 20, 2014 || Catalina || CSS ||  || align=right | 2.3 km || 
|-id=428 bgcolor=#d6d6d6
| 544428 ||  || — || November 9, 2009 || Kitt Peak || Spacewatch ||  || align=right | 2.7 km || 
|-id=429 bgcolor=#E9E9E9
| 544429 ||  || — || August 22, 2014 || Haleakala || Pan-STARRS ||  || align=right | 2.7 km || 
|-id=430 bgcolor=#C2E0FF
| 544430 ||  || — || March 17, 2015 || Haleakala || Pan-STARRS || res2:5 || align=right | 189 km || 
|-id=431 bgcolor=#fefefe
| 544431 ||  || — || October 20, 2014 || Mount Lemmon || Mount Lemmon Survey || H || align=right data-sort-value="0.71" | 710 m || 
|-id=432 bgcolor=#fefefe
| 544432 ||  || — || October 18, 2014 || Mount Lemmon || Mount Lemmon Survey || H || align=right data-sort-value="0.68" | 680 m || 
|-id=433 bgcolor=#d6d6d6
| 544433 ||  || — || May 29, 2012 || Mount Lemmon || Mount Lemmon Survey ||  || align=right | 2.5 km || 
|-id=434 bgcolor=#E9E9E9
| 544434 ||  || — || January 14, 2011 || Kitt Peak || Spacewatch ||  || align=right | 1.7 km || 
|-id=435 bgcolor=#E9E9E9
| 544435 ||  || — || December 5, 2010 || Mount Lemmon || Mount Lemmon Survey ||  || align=right | 1.5 km || 
|-id=436 bgcolor=#E9E9E9
| 544436 ||  || — || October 26, 2014 || Mount Lemmon || Mount Lemmon Survey ||  || align=right | 1.8 km || 
|-id=437 bgcolor=#d6d6d6
| 544437 ||  || — || October 28, 2014 || Haleakala || Pan-STARRS ||  || align=right | 2.6 km || 
|-id=438 bgcolor=#E9E9E9
| 544438 ||  || — || October 24, 2014 || Kitt Peak || Spacewatch ||  || align=right | 1.2 km || 
|-id=439 bgcolor=#d6d6d6
| 544439 ||  || — || December 10, 2009 || Mount Lemmon || Mount Lemmon Survey ||  || align=right | 2.0 km || 
|-id=440 bgcolor=#E9E9E9
| 544440 ||  || — || October 18, 2001 || Kitt Peak || Spacewatch ||  || align=right | 1.5 km || 
|-id=441 bgcolor=#d6d6d6
| 544441 ||  || — || March 1, 2012 || Mount Lemmon || Mount Lemmon Survey ||  || align=right | 2.8 km || 
|-id=442 bgcolor=#d6d6d6
| 544442 ||  || — || October 26, 2014 || Mount Lemmon || Mount Lemmon Survey ||  || align=right | 2.2 km || 
|-id=443 bgcolor=#d6d6d6
| 544443 ||  || — || January 31, 2012 || Haleakala || Pan-STARRS ||  || align=right | 3.1 km || 
|-id=444 bgcolor=#E9E9E9
| 544444 ||  || — || November 6, 2005 || Mount Lemmon || Mount Lemmon Survey ||  || align=right | 2.7 km || 
|-id=445 bgcolor=#E9E9E9
| 544445 ||  || — || April 15, 2012 || Haleakala || Pan-STARRS ||  || align=right | 1.2 km || 
|-id=446 bgcolor=#d6d6d6
| 544446 ||  || — || October 24, 2014 || Mount Lemmon || Mount Lemmon Survey ||  || align=right | 4.4 km || 
|-id=447 bgcolor=#E9E9E9
| 544447 ||  || — || October 6, 2005 || Kitt Peak || Spacewatch ||  || align=right | 1.3 km || 
|-id=448 bgcolor=#E9E9E9
| 544448 ||  || — || October 26, 2014 || Mount Lemmon || Mount Lemmon Survey ||  || align=right | 1.3 km || 
|-id=449 bgcolor=#E9E9E9
| 544449 ||  || — || September 26, 2009 || Kitt Peak || Spacewatch ||  || align=right | 2.1 km || 
|-id=450 bgcolor=#E9E9E9
| 544450 ||  || — || October 30, 2014 || Haleakala || Pan-STARRS ||  || align=right | 1.3 km || 
|-id=451 bgcolor=#E9E9E9
| 544451 ||  || — || October 26, 2014 || Mount Lemmon || Mount Lemmon Survey ||  || align=right | 1.1 km || 
|-id=452 bgcolor=#E9E9E9
| 544452 ||  || — || November 27, 2006 || Mount Lemmon || Mount Lemmon Survey ||  || align=right | 1.4 km || 
|-id=453 bgcolor=#d6d6d6
| 544453 ||  || — || September 27, 2009 || Mount Lemmon || Mount Lemmon Survey ||  || align=right | 2.9 km || 
|-id=454 bgcolor=#E9E9E9
| 544454 ||  || — || December 13, 2010 || Mount Lemmon || Mount Lemmon Survey ||  || align=right | 1.5 km || 
|-id=455 bgcolor=#E9E9E9
| 544455 ||  || — || August 23, 2014 || Haleakala || Pan-STARRS ||  || align=right | 1.8 km || 
|-id=456 bgcolor=#d6d6d6
| 544456 ||  || — || July 9, 2003 || Kitt Peak || Spacewatch ||  || align=right | 3.3 km || 
|-id=457 bgcolor=#E9E9E9
| 544457 ||  || — || April 30, 2012 || Kitt Peak || Spacewatch ||  || align=right | 1.8 km || 
|-id=458 bgcolor=#d6d6d6
| 544458 ||  || — || September 18, 2003 || Kitt Peak || Spacewatch ||  || align=right | 3.3 km || 
|-id=459 bgcolor=#d6d6d6
| 544459 ||  || — || October 25, 2014 || Haleakala || Pan-STARRS ||  || align=right | 2.7 km || 
|-id=460 bgcolor=#E9E9E9
| 544460 ||  || — || October 24, 2009 || XuYi || PMO NEO ||  || align=right | 3.1 km || 
|-id=461 bgcolor=#fefefe
| 544461 ||  || — || March 17, 2005 || Kitt Peak || Spacewatch ||  || align=right | 1.1 km || 
|-id=462 bgcolor=#E9E9E9
| 544462 ||  || — || February 10, 2008 || Mount Lemmon || Mount Lemmon Survey ||  || align=right | 1.7 km || 
|-id=463 bgcolor=#d6d6d6
| 544463 ||  || — || May 26, 2007 || Mount Lemmon || Mount Lemmon Survey || Tj (2.99) || align=right | 2.7 km || 
|-id=464 bgcolor=#E9E9E9
| 544464 ||  || — || October 19, 2014 || Kitt Peak || Spacewatch ||  || align=right | 1.9 km || 
|-id=465 bgcolor=#E9E9E9
| 544465 ||  || — || December 31, 2005 || Kitt Peak || Spacewatch ||  || align=right | 2.0 km || 
|-id=466 bgcolor=#E9E9E9
| 544466 ||  || — || September 1, 2005 || Palomar || NEAT ||  || align=right | 2.1 km || 
|-id=467 bgcolor=#E9E9E9
| 544467 ||  || — || November 4, 2014 || Mount Lemmon || Mount Lemmon Survey ||  || align=right | 2.2 km || 
|-id=468 bgcolor=#E9E9E9
| 544468 ||  || — || August 25, 2005 || Campo Imperatore || A. Boattini ||  || align=right | 1.2 km || 
|-id=469 bgcolor=#d6d6d6
| 544469 ||  || — || November 12, 2014 || Haleakala || Pan-STARRS ||  || align=right | 3.2 km || 
|-id=470 bgcolor=#d6d6d6
| 544470 ||  || — || November 12, 2014 || Haleakala || Pan-STARRS ||  || align=right | 2.8 km || 
|-id=471 bgcolor=#d6d6d6
| 544471 ||  || — || September 10, 2013 || Haleakala || Pan-STARRS ||  || align=right | 2.7 km || 
|-id=472 bgcolor=#E9E9E9
| 544472 ||  || — || November 29, 2005 || Kitt Peak || Spacewatch ||  || align=right | 1.8 km || 
|-id=473 bgcolor=#E9E9E9
| 544473 ||  || — || October 4, 2014 || Mount Lemmon || Mount Lemmon Survey ||  || align=right | 1.9 km || 
|-id=474 bgcolor=#d6d6d6
| 544474 ||  || — || October 20, 2003 || Palomar || NEAT ||  || align=right | 3.3 km || 
|-id=475 bgcolor=#d6d6d6
| 544475 ||  || — || August 27, 2003 || Haleakala || AMOS ||  || align=right | 3.1 km || 
|-id=476 bgcolor=#E9E9E9
| 544476 ||  || — || October 26, 2005 || Kitt Peak || Spacewatch ||  || align=right | 1.2 km || 
|-id=477 bgcolor=#d6d6d6
| 544477 ||  || — || March 6, 2011 || Mount Lemmon || Mount Lemmon Survey ||  || align=right | 2.2 km || 
|-id=478 bgcolor=#E9E9E9
| 544478 ||  || — || November 14, 2014 || Kitt Peak || Spacewatch ||  || align=right | 2.3 km || 
|-id=479 bgcolor=#E9E9E9
| 544479 ||  || — || January 29, 2011 || Mount Lemmon || Mount Lemmon Survey ||  || align=right | 1.6 km || 
|-id=480 bgcolor=#E9E9E9
| 544480 ||  || — || October 11, 2005 || Kitt Peak || Spacewatch ||  || align=right | 1.2 km || 
|-id=481 bgcolor=#E9E9E9
| 544481 ||  || — || July 5, 2013 || Bergisch Gladbach || W. Bickel ||  || align=right | 1.1 km || 
|-id=482 bgcolor=#d6d6d6
| 544482 ||  || — || August 28, 2003 || Palomar || NEAT ||  || align=right | 2.3 km || 
|-id=483 bgcolor=#E9E9E9
| 544483 ||  || — || August 31, 2005 || Palomar || NEAT ||  || align=right | 1.5 km || 
|-id=484 bgcolor=#d6d6d6
| 544484 ||  || — || November 4, 2014 || Mount Lemmon || Mount Lemmon Survey ||  || align=right | 2.9 km || 
|-id=485 bgcolor=#d6d6d6
| 544485 ||  || — || November 16, 2014 || Mount Lemmon || Mount Lemmon Survey ||  || align=right | 2.5 km || 
|-id=486 bgcolor=#E9E9E9
| 544486 ||  || — || November 6, 2005 || Mount Lemmon || Mount Lemmon Survey ||  || align=right | 1.5 km || 
|-id=487 bgcolor=#fefefe
| 544487 ||  || — || April 11, 2008 || Catalina || CSS || H || align=right data-sort-value="0.75" | 750 m || 
|-id=488 bgcolor=#E9E9E9
| 544488 ||  || — || October 5, 2005 || Mount Lemmon || Mount Lemmon Survey ||  || align=right | 1.3 km || 
|-id=489 bgcolor=#E9E9E9
| 544489 ||  || — || September 12, 2005 || Kitt Peak || Spacewatch ||  || align=right | 1.2 km || 
|-id=490 bgcolor=#E9E9E9
| 544490 ||  || — || March 16, 2004 || Kitt Peak || Spacewatch ||  || align=right data-sort-value="0.94" | 940 m || 
|-id=491 bgcolor=#E9E9E9
| 544491 ||  || — || August 15, 2013 || Haleakala || Pan-STARRS ||  || align=right | 1.3 km || 
|-id=492 bgcolor=#E9E9E9
| 544492 ||  || — || November 16, 2014 || Mount Lemmon || Mount Lemmon Survey ||  || align=right | 1.5 km || 
|-id=493 bgcolor=#E9E9E9
| 544493 ||  || — || October 17, 2009 || Mount Lemmon || Mount Lemmon Survey ||  || align=right | 1.8 km || 
|-id=494 bgcolor=#E9E9E9
| 544494 ||  || — || December 3, 2010 || Mount Lemmon || Mount Lemmon Survey ||  || align=right | 1.2 km || 
|-id=495 bgcolor=#E9E9E9
| 544495 ||  || — || March 29, 2004 || Kitt Peak || Spacewatch ||  || align=right data-sort-value="0.96" | 960 m || 
|-id=496 bgcolor=#E9E9E9
| 544496 ||  || — || October 25, 2014 || Haleakala || Pan-STARRS ||  || align=right data-sort-value="0.89" | 890 m || 
|-id=497 bgcolor=#E9E9E9
| 544497 ||  || — || October 27, 2005 || Mount Lemmon || Mount Lemmon Survey ||  || align=right | 1.1 km || 
|-id=498 bgcolor=#E9E9E9
| 544498 ||  || — || November 25, 2005 || Mount Lemmon || Mount Lemmon Survey ||  || align=right | 2.0 km || 
|-id=499 bgcolor=#E9E9E9
| 544499 ||  || — || November 22, 2006 || Mount Lemmon || Mount Lemmon Survey ||  || align=right | 1.6 km || 
|-id=500 bgcolor=#d6d6d6
| 544500 ||  || — || October 24, 2008 || Kitt Peak || Spacewatch || 7:4 || align=right | 3.4 km || 
|}

544501–544600 

|-bgcolor=#E9E9E9
| 544501 ||  || — || February 13, 2007 || Mount Lemmon || Mount Lemmon Survey ||  || align=right | 2.0 km || 
|-id=502 bgcolor=#E9E9E9
| 544502 ||  || — || October 11, 2010 || Mount Lemmon || Mount Lemmon Survey ||  || align=right | 1.2 km || 
|-id=503 bgcolor=#d6d6d6
| 544503 ||  || — || November 11, 2009 || Kitt Peak || Spacewatch ||  || align=right | 2.1 km || 
|-id=504 bgcolor=#E9E9E9
| 544504 ||  || — || January 19, 2012 || Haleakala || Pan-STARRS ||  || align=right | 1.1 km || 
|-id=505 bgcolor=#d6d6d6
| 544505 ||  || — || November 8, 2009 || Mount Lemmon || Mount Lemmon Survey ||  || align=right | 2.1 km || 
|-id=506 bgcolor=#E9E9E9
| 544506 ||  || — || February 27, 2012 || Haleakala || Pan-STARRS ||  || align=right | 1.3 km || 
|-id=507 bgcolor=#d6d6d6
| 544507 ||  || — || July 16, 2013 || Haleakala || Pan-STARRS ||  || align=right | 3.3 km || 
|-id=508 bgcolor=#E9E9E9
| 544508 ||  || — || February 27, 2012 || Haleakala || Pan-STARRS ||  || align=right | 1.3 km || 
|-id=509 bgcolor=#E9E9E9
| 544509 ||  || — || September 14, 2005 || Kitt Peak || Spacewatch ||  || align=right | 1.4 km || 
|-id=510 bgcolor=#d6d6d6
| 544510 ||  || — || October 25, 2014 || Haleakala || Pan-STARRS ||  || align=right | 2.2 km || 
|-id=511 bgcolor=#d6d6d6
| 544511 ||  || — || December 20, 2009 || Mount Lemmon || Mount Lemmon Survey ||  || align=right | 2.5 km || 
|-id=512 bgcolor=#E9E9E9
| 544512 ||  || — || July 2, 2013 || Haleakala || Pan-STARRS ||  || align=right | 1.9 km || 
|-id=513 bgcolor=#E9E9E9
| 544513 ||  || — || December 7, 2001 || Kitt Peak || Spacewatch ||  || align=right | 2.2 km || 
|-id=514 bgcolor=#d6d6d6
| 544514 ||  || — || November 10, 2009 || Kitt Peak || Spacewatch ||  || align=right | 1.7 km || 
|-id=515 bgcolor=#d6d6d6
| 544515 ||  || — || November 9, 2009 || Mount Lemmon || Mount Lemmon Survey ||  || align=right | 1.8 km || 
|-id=516 bgcolor=#fefefe
| 544516 ||  || — || February 2, 2005 || Kitt Peak || Spacewatch ||  || align=right | 1.0 km || 
|-id=517 bgcolor=#E9E9E9
| 544517 ||  || — || November 14, 2010 || Mount Lemmon || Mount Lemmon Survey ||  || align=right | 1.0 km || 
|-id=518 bgcolor=#E9E9E9
| 544518 ||  || — || May 16, 2013 || Haleakala || Pan-STARRS ||  || align=right data-sort-value="0.90" | 900 m || 
|-id=519 bgcolor=#E9E9E9
| 544519 ||  || — || December 14, 2010 || Mount Lemmon || Mount Lemmon Survey ||  || align=right | 1.2 km || 
|-id=520 bgcolor=#E9E9E9
| 544520 ||  || — || December 14, 2006 || Palomar || NEAT ||  || align=right | 2.0 km || 
|-id=521 bgcolor=#d6d6d6
| 544521 ||  || — || November 9, 2009 || Mount Lemmon || Mount Lemmon Survey ||  || align=right | 2.3 km || 
|-id=522 bgcolor=#E9E9E9
| 544522 ||  || — || December 3, 2010 || Mount Lemmon || Mount Lemmon Survey ||  || align=right data-sort-value="0.96" | 960 m || 
|-id=523 bgcolor=#E9E9E9
| 544523 ||  || — || December 28, 2005 || Mount Lemmon || Mount Lemmon Survey ||  || align=right | 2.0 km || 
|-id=524 bgcolor=#d6d6d6
| 544524 ||  || — || November 12, 2014 || Haleakala || Pan-STARRS ||  || align=right | 2.9 km || 
|-id=525 bgcolor=#d6d6d6
| 544525 ||  || — || November 20, 2009 || Kitt Peak || Spacewatch ||  || align=right | 1.8 km || 
|-id=526 bgcolor=#E9E9E9
| 544526 ||  || — || November 19, 2006 || Kitt Peak || Spacewatch ||  || align=right | 1.00 km || 
|-id=527 bgcolor=#d6d6d6
| 544527 ||  || — || November 16, 2009 || Mount Lemmon || Mount Lemmon Survey ||  || align=right | 2.1 km || 
|-id=528 bgcolor=#E9E9E9
| 544528 ||  || — || September 25, 2014 || Mount Lemmon || Mount Lemmon Survey ||  || align=right | 2.1 km || 
|-id=529 bgcolor=#E9E9E9
| 544529 ||  || — || September 25, 2005 || Kitt Peak || Spacewatch ||  || align=right | 1.3 km || 
|-id=530 bgcolor=#E9E9E9
| 544530 ||  || — || July 16, 2013 || Haleakala || Pan-STARRS ||  || align=right | 1.2 km || 
|-id=531 bgcolor=#E9E9E9
| 544531 ||  || — || October 22, 2014 || Kitt Peak || Spacewatch ||  || align=right | 1.6 km || 
|-id=532 bgcolor=#E9E9E9
| 544532 ||  || — || November 12, 2010 || Mount Lemmon || Mount Lemmon Survey ||  || align=right data-sort-value="0.78" | 780 m || 
|-id=533 bgcolor=#E9E9E9
| 544533 ||  || — || July 5, 2005 || Mount Lemmon || Mount Lemmon Survey ||  || align=right | 1.1 km || 
|-id=534 bgcolor=#d6d6d6
| 544534 ||  || — || May 1, 2003 || Kitt Peak || Spacewatch ||  || align=right | 2.4 km || 
|-id=535 bgcolor=#E9E9E9
| 544535 ||  || — || November 6, 2005 || Pla D'Arguines || R. Ferrando, M. Ferrando ||  || align=right | 2.3 km || 
|-id=536 bgcolor=#FA8072
| 544536 ||  || — || November 19, 2014 || Catalina || CSS || H || align=right data-sort-value="0.59" | 590 m || 
|-id=537 bgcolor=#E9E9E9
| 544537 ||  || — || December 25, 2010 || Mount Lemmon || Mount Lemmon Survey ||  || align=right | 1.3 km || 
|-id=538 bgcolor=#E9E9E9
| 544538 ||  || — || November 16, 2014 || Kitt Peak || Spacewatch ||  || align=right | 1.1 km || 
|-id=539 bgcolor=#d6d6d6
| 544539 ||  || — || January 27, 2011 || Mount Lemmon || Mount Lemmon Survey ||  || align=right | 3.4 km || 
|-id=540 bgcolor=#E9E9E9
| 544540 ||  || — || March 26, 2008 || Mount Lemmon || Mount Lemmon Survey ||  || align=right | 1.0 km || 
|-id=541 bgcolor=#d6d6d6
| 544541 Srholec ||  ||  || March 24, 2011 || Piszkesteto || S. Kürti, K. Sárneczky ||  || align=right | 3.0 km || 
|-id=542 bgcolor=#E9E9E9
| 544542 ||  || — || May 5, 2008 || Kitt Peak || Spacewatch ||  || align=right data-sort-value="0.98" | 980 m || 
|-id=543 bgcolor=#E9E9E9
| 544543 ||  || — || October 25, 2014 || Haleakala || Pan-STARRS ||  || align=right | 1.2 km || 
|-id=544 bgcolor=#E9E9E9
| 544544 ||  || — || April 29, 2012 || Kitt Peak || Spacewatch ||  || align=right | 1.0 km || 
|-id=545 bgcolor=#E9E9E9
| 544545 ||  || — || November 17, 2014 || Mount Lemmon || Mount Lemmon Survey ||  || align=right | 1.6 km || 
|-id=546 bgcolor=#E9E9E9
| 544546 ||  || — || December 3, 2010 || Kitt Peak || Spacewatch ||  || align=right | 1.3 km || 
|-id=547 bgcolor=#E9E9E9
| 544547 ||  || — || November 17, 2014 || Mount Lemmon || Mount Lemmon Survey ||  || align=right | 1.1 km || 
|-id=548 bgcolor=#E9E9E9
| 544548 ||  || — || August 22, 2014 || Haleakala || Pan-STARRS ||  || align=right | 1.5 km || 
|-id=549 bgcolor=#E9E9E9
| 544549 ||  || — || September 23, 2005 || Kitt Peak || Spacewatch ||  || align=right | 1.8 km || 
|-id=550 bgcolor=#E9E9E9
| 544550 ||  || — || October 28, 2014 || Haleakala || Pan-STARRS ||  || align=right | 2.4 km || 
|-id=551 bgcolor=#d6d6d6
| 544551 ||  || — || August 31, 2014 || Haleakala || Pan-STARRS ||  || align=right | 2.6 km || 
|-id=552 bgcolor=#E9E9E9
| 544552 ||  || — || September 24, 2005 || Kitt Peak || Spacewatch ||  || align=right | 1.5 km || 
|-id=553 bgcolor=#E9E9E9
| 544553 ||  || — || October 30, 2010 || Kitt Peak || Spacewatch ||  || align=right | 2.8 km || 
|-id=554 bgcolor=#E9E9E9
| 544554 ||  || — || May 27, 2009 || Mount Lemmon || Mount Lemmon Survey ||  || align=right | 2.9 km || 
|-id=555 bgcolor=#d6d6d6
| 544555 ||  || — || December 3, 2010 || Kitt Peak || Spacewatch ||  || align=right | 2.0 km || 
|-id=556 bgcolor=#E9E9E9
| 544556 ||  || — || February 24, 2012 || Kitt Peak || Spacewatch ||  || align=right | 1.6 km || 
|-id=557 bgcolor=#fefefe
| 544557 ||  || — || July 3, 2014 || Haleakala || Pan-STARRS || H || align=right data-sort-value="0.82" | 820 m || 
|-id=558 bgcolor=#E9E9E9
| 544558 ||  || — || October 29, 2014 || Haleakala || Pan-STARRS ||  || align=right | 1.6 km || 
|-id=559 bgcolor=#fefefe
| 544559 ||  || — || November 3, 2014 || Mount Lemmon || Mount Lemmon Survey || H || align=right data-sort-value="0.64" | 640 m || 
|-id=560 bgcolor=#FA8072
| 544560 ||  || — || July 26, 2011 || Haleakala || Pan-STARRS || H || align=right data-sort-value="0.68" | 680 m || 
|-id=561 bgcolor=#E9E9E9
| 544561 ||  || — || March 24, 2011 || Piszkesteto || Z. Kuli, K. Sárneczky ||  || align=right | 1.8 km || 
|-id=562 bgcolor=#E9E9E9
| 544562 ||  || — || October 12, 2005 || Kitt Peak || Spacewatch ||  || align=right | 1.5 km || 
|-id=563 bgcolor=#d6d6d6
| 544563 ||  || — || November 16, 2014 || Kitt Peak || Spacewatch || EOS || align=right | 1.5 km || 
|-id=564 bgcolor=#E9E9E9
| 544564 ||  || — || September 25, 2009 || Kitt Peak || Spacewatch ||  || align=right | 1.9 km || 
|-id=565 bgcolor=#d6d6d6
| 544565 ||  || — || March 14, 2011 || Mount Lemmon || Mount Lemmon Survey ||  || align=right | 2.0 km || 
|-id=566 bgcolor=#E9E9E9
| 544566 ||  || — || July 31, 2005 || Palomar || NEAT ||  || align=right | 1.5 km || 
|-id=567 bgcolor=#d6d6d6
| 544567 ||  || — || March 24, 2011 || Piszkesteto || Z. Kuli, K. Sárneczky || TEL || align=right | 1.2 km || 
|-id=568 bgcolor=#E9E9E9
| 544568 ||  || — || September 15, 2009 || Kitt Peak || Spacewatch ||  || align=right | 2.0 km || 
|-id=569 bgcolor=#d6d6d6
| 544569 ||  || — || October 8, 2008 || Mount Lemmon || Mount Lemmon Survey ||  || align=right | 2.4 km || 
|-id=570 bgcolor=#E9E9E9
| 544570 ||  || — || October 11, 2010 || Kitt Peak || Spacewatch ||  || align=right | 1.7 km || 
|-id=571 bgcolor=#d6d6d6
| 544571 ||  || — || March 9, 2011 || Mount Lemmon || Mount Lemmon Survey ||  || align=right | 2.7 km || 
|-id=572 bgcolor=#E9E9E9
| 544572 ||  || — || September 23, 2014 || Haleakala || Pan-STARRS ||  || align=right | 1.8 km || 
|-id=573 bgcolor=#E9E9E9
| 544573 ||  || — || November 25, 2005 || Mount Lemmon || Mount Lemmon Survey ||  || align=right | 1.8 km || 
|-id=574 bgcolor=#E9E9E9
| 544574 ||  || — || July 13, 2013 || Mount Lemmon || Mount Lemmon Survey ||  || align=right | 1.9 km || 
|-id=575 bgcolor=#E9E9E9
| 544575 ||  || — || October 21, 2014 || Kitt Peak || Spacewatch ||  || align=right | 2.2 km || 
|-id=576 bgcolor=#FA8072
| 544576 ||  || — || November 24, 2009 || Kitt Peak || Spacewatch || H || align=right data-sort-value="0.40" | 400 m || 
|-id=577 bgcolor=#E9E9E9
| 544577 ||  || — || December 4, 2010 || Mount Lemmon || Mount Lemmon Survey ||  || align=right | 1.1 km || 
|-id=578 bgcolor=#E9E9E9
| 544578 ||  || — || February 12, 2011 || Mount Lemmon || Mount Lemmon Survey ||  || align=right | 1.9 km || 
|-id=579 bgcolor=#E9E9E9
| 544579 ||  || — || December 8, 1996 || Kitt Peak || Spacewatch ||  || align=right | 2.1 km || 
|-id=580 bgcolor=#E9E9E9
| 544580 ||  || — || August 31, 2014 || Haleakala || Pan-STARRS ||  || align=right data-sort-value="0.90" | 900 m || 
|-id=581 bgcolor=#E9E9E9
| 544581 ||  || — || November 3, 2010 || Mount Lemmon || Mount Lemmon Survey ||  || align=right | 1.0 km || 
|-id=582 bgcolor=#fefefe
| 544582 ||  || — || May 30, 2006 || Mount Lemmon || Mount Lemmon Survey ||  || align=right data-sort-value="0.86" | 860 m || 
|-id=583 bgcolor=#d6d6d6
| 544583 ||  || — || April 20, 2012 || Mount Lemmon || Mount Lemmon Survey ||  || align=right | 1.9 km || 
|-id=584 bgcolor=#d6d6d6
| 544584 ||  || — || October 16, 2009 || Mount Lemmon || Mount Lemmon Survey ||  || align=right | 2.0 km || 
|-id=585 bgcolor=#d6d6d6
| 544585 ||  || — || April 23, 2012 || Kitt Peak || Spacewatch ||  || align=right | 2.1 km || 
|-id=586 bgcolor=#E9E9E9
| 544586 ||  || — || November 8, 2010 || Mount Lemmon || Mount Lemmon Survey ||  || align=right | 1.2 km || 
|-id=587 bgcolor=#E9E9E9
| 544587 ||  || — || April 14, 2008 || Kitt Peak || Spacewatch ||  || align=right | 1.9 km || 
|-id=588 bgcolor=#E9E9E9
| 544588 ||  || — || March 4, 1997 || Kitt Peak || Spacewatch ||  || align=right | 1.8 km || 
|-id=589 bgcolor=#E9E9E9
| 544589 ||  || — || October 15, 2001 || Palomar || NEAT ||  || align=right | 1.5 km || 
|-id=590 bgcolor=#d6d6d6
| 544590 ||  || — || September 3, 2008 || Kitt Peak || Spacewatch || EOS || align=right | 1.5 km || 
|-id=591 bgcolor=#E9E9E9
| 544591 ||  || — || December 6, 2010 || Kitt Peak || Spacewatch ||  || align=right | 1.1 km || 
|-id=592 bgcolor=#E9E9E9
| 544592 ||  || — || April 4, 1995 || Kitt Peak || Spacewatch ||  || align=right | 1.6 km || 
|-id=593 bgcolor=#d6d6d6
| 544593 ||  || — || May 20, 2012 || Haleakala || Pan-STARRS ||  || align=right | 2.2 km || 
|-id=594 bgcolor=#E9E9E9
| 544594 ||  || — || November 22, 2005 || Kitt Peak || Spacewatch ||  || align=right | 1.8 km || 
|-id=595 bgcolor=#E9E9E9
| 544595 ||  || — || March 28, 2008 || Kitt Peak || Spacewatch ||  || align=right | 1.0 km || 
|-id=596 bgcolor=#E9E9E9
| 544596 ||  || — || February 13, 2008 || Kitt Peak || Spacewatch ||  || align=right data-sort-value="0.76" | 760 m || 
|-id=597 bgcolor=#E9E9E9
| 544597 ||  || — || March 28, 2008 || Kitt Peak || Spacewatch ||  || align=right | 2.4 km || 
|-id=598 bgcolor=#E9E9E9
| 544598 ||  || — || November 7, 2010 || Catalina || CSS ||  || align=right | 1.6 km || 
|-id=599 bgcolor=#E9E9E9
| 544599 ||  || — || August 25, 2014 || Haleakala || Pan-STARRS ||  || align=right | 1.9 km || 
|-id=600 bgcolor=#d6d6d6
| 544600 ||  || — || March 1, 2011 || Mount Lemmon || Mount Lemmon Survey ||  || align=right | 2.2 km || 
|}

544601–544700 

|-bgcolor=#E9E9E9
| 544601 ||  || — || September 23, 2014 || Haleakala || Pan-STARRS ||  || align=right | 1.2 km || 
|-id=602 bgcolor=#E9E9E9
| 544602 ||  || — || October 25, 2014 || Haleakala || Pan-STARRS ||  || align=right | 1.2 km || 
|-id=603 bgcolor=#E9E9E9
| 544603 ||  || — || November 4, 2005 || Mount Lemmon || Mount Lemmon Survey ||  || align=right | 2.2 km || 
|-id=604 bgcolor=#E9E9E9
| 544604 ||  || — || February 9, 1999 || Kitt Peak || Spacewatch ||  || align=right data-sort-value="0.83" | 830 m || 
|-id=605 bgcolor=#fefefe
| 544605 ||  || — || August 30, 2014 || Haleakala || Pan-STARRS ||  || align=right data-sort-value="0.83" | 830 m || 
|-id=606 bgcolor=#d6d6d6
| 544606 ||  || — || February 13, 2011 || Mount Lemmon || Mount Lemmon Survey ||  || align=right | 2.1 km || 
|-id=607 bgcolor=#d6d6d6
| 544607 ||  || — || September 24, 2014 || Haleakala || Pan-STARRS ||  || align=right | 2.4 km || 
|-id=608 bgcolor=#d6d6d6
| 544608 ||  || — || April 4, 2011 || Mount Lemmon || Mount Lemmon Survey ||  || align=right | 3.6 km || 
|-id=609 bgcolor=#d6d6d6
| 544609 ||  || — || November 20, 2014 || Mount Lemmon || Mount Lemmon Survey ||  || align=right | 3.0 km || 
|-id=610 bgcolor=#E9E9E9
| 544610 ||  || — || October 2, 2013 || Mount Lemmon || Mount Lemmon Survey ||  || align=right | 2.7 km || 
|-id=611 bgcolor=#d6d6d6
| 544611 ||  || — || October 28, 2008 || Kitt Peak || Spacewatch ||  || align=right | 2.8 km || 
|-id=612 bgcolor=#E9E9E9
| 544612 ||  || — || March 27, 2008 || Mount Lemmon || Mount Lemmon Survey ||  || align=right | 2.0 km || 
|-id=613 bgcolor=#d6d6d6
| 544613 ||  || — || October 12, 2009 || Mount Lemmon || Mount Lemmon Survey ||  || align=right | 2.0 km || 
|-id=614 bgcolor=#d6d6d6
| 544614 ||  || — || September 20, 2014 || Haleakala || Pan-STARRS ||  || align=right | 2.2 km || 
|-id=615 bgcolor=#E9E9E9
| 544615 ||  || — || September 30, 2005 || Mount Lemmon || Mount Lemmon Survey ||  || align=right | 1.1 km || 
|-id=616 bgcolor=#E9E9E9
| 544616 ||  || — || July 2, 2013 || Haleakala || Pan-STARRS ||  || align=right | 1.4 km || 
|-id=617 bgcolor=#E9E9E9
| 544617 ||  || — || January 13, 2011 || Kitt Peak || Spacewatch ||  || align=right | 1.8 km || 
|-id=618 bgcolor=#E9E9E9
| 544618 Bugátpál ||  ||  || October 29, 2014 || Piszkesteto || K. Sárneczky, P. Székely ||  || align=right | 1.3 km || 
|-id=619 bgcolor=#E9E9E9
| 544619 ||  || — || September 29, 2005 || Catalina || CSS ||  || align=right | 1.2 km || 
|-id=620 bgcolor=#E9E9E9
| 544620 ||  || — || October 30, 2010 || Mount Lemmon || Mount Lemmon Survey ||  || align=right | 1.2 km || 
|-id=621 bgcolor=#E9E9E9
| 544621 ||  || — || November 21, 2014 || Mount Lemmon || Mount Lemmon Survey ||  || align=right data-sort-value="0.96" | 960 m || 
|-id=622 bgcolor=#d6d6d6
| 544622 ||  || — || October 30, 2014 || Mount Lemmon || Mount Lemmon Survey ||  || align=right | 2.5 km || 
|-id=623 bgcolor=#E9E9E9
| 544623 ||  || — || January 29, 2011 || Mount Lemmon || Mount Lemmon Survey ||  || align=right | 1.8 km || 
|-id=624 bgcolor=#d6d6d6
| 544624 ||  || — || June 15, 2013 || Mount Lemmon || Mount Lemmon Survey ||  || align=right | 3.4 km || 
|-id=625 bgcolor=#E9E9E9
| 544625 ||  || — || February 25, 2007 || Mount Lemmon || Mount Lemmon Survey ||  || align=right | 1.9 km || 
|-id=626 bgcolor=#E9E9E9
| 544626 ||  || — || February 13, 2011 || Mount Lemmon || Mount Lemmon Survey || DOR || align=right | 1.7 km || 
|-id=627 bgcolor=#E9E9E9
| 544627 ||  || — || August 6, 2005 || Palomar || NEAT ||  || align=right | 1.5 km || 
|-id=628 bgcolor=#E9E9E9
| 544628 ||  || — || October 6, 2005 || Mount Lemmon || Mount Lemmon Survey ||  || align=right | 1.2 km || 
|-id=629 bgcolor=#E9E9E9
| 544629 ||  || — || March 21, 2012 || Mount Lemmon || Mount Lemmon Survey ||  || align=right | 1.3 km || 
|-id=630 bgcolor=#E9E9E9
| 544630 ||  || — || November 17, 2014 || Haleakala || Pan-STARRS ||  || align=right | 1.8 km || 
|-id=631 bgcolor=#E9E9E9
| 544631 ||  || — || October 29, 2001 || Palomar || NEAT ||  || align=right | 1.7 km || 
|-id=632 bgcolor=#E9E9E9
| 544632 ||  || — || November 13, 2010 || Kitt Peak || Spacewatch ||  || align=right | 1.0 km || 
|-id=633 bgcolor=#E9E9E9
| 544633 ||  || — || June 12, 2004 || Kitt Peak || Spacewatch ||  || align=right | 1.8 km || 
|-id=634 bgcolor=#E9E9E9
| 544634 ||  || — || October 30, 2005 || Mount Lemmon || Mount Lemmon Survey ||  || align=right | 2.4 km || 
|-id=635 bgcolor=#E9E9E9
| 544635 ||  || — || October 28, 2014 || Haleakala || Pan-STARRS ||  || align=right | 2.0 km || 
|-id=636 bgcolor=#E9E9E9
| 544636 ||  || — || April 6, 2008 || Kitt Peak || Spacewatch ||  || align=right | 1.2 km || 
|-id=637 bgcolor=#E9E9E9
| 544637 ||  || — || August 31, 2005 || Kitt Peak || Spacewatch ||  || align=right | 1.1 km || 
|-id=638 bgcolor=#E9E9E9
| 544638 ||  || — || November 14, 2001 || Kitt Peak || Spacewatch ||  || align=right | 1.1 km || 
|-id=639 bgcolor=#E9E9E9
| 544639 ||  || — || September 21, 2001 || Palomar || NEAT || MAR || align=right | 1.4 km || 
|-id=640 bgcolor=#d6d6d6
| 544640 ||  || — || November 18, 2014 || Haleakala || Pan-STARRS ||  || align=right | 3.6 km || 
|-id=641 bgcolor=#d6d6d6
| 544641 ||  || — || February 24, 2006 || Kitt Peak || Spacewatch ||  || align=right | 2.1 km || 
|-id=642 bgcolor=#E9E9E9
| 544642 ||  || — || June 28, 2001 || Palomar || NEAT || (5) || align=right | 1.2 km || 
|-id=643 bgcolor=#E9E9E9
| 544643 ||  || — || June 17, 2005 || Mount Lemmon || Mount Lemmon Survey ||  || align=right data-sort-value="0.99" | 990 m || 
|-id=644 bgcolor=#d6d6d6
| 544644 ||  || — || November 19, 2014 || Mount Lemmon || Mount Lemmon Survey ||  || align=right | 2.5 km || 
|-id=645 bgcolor=#d6d6d6
| 544645 ||  || — || November 19, 2014 || Catalina || CSS ||  || align=right | 3.6 km || 
|-id=646 bgcolor=#E9E9E9
| 544646 ||  || — || October 24, 2005 || Palomar || NEAT || ADE || align=right | 2.4 km || 
|-id=647 bgcolor=#E9E9E9
| 544647 ||  || — || March 28, 2008 || Mount Lemmon || Mount Lemmon Survey ||  || align=right | 1.1 km || 
|-id=648 bgcolor=#d6d6d6
| 544648 ||  || — || November 20, 2014 || Mount Lemmon || Mount Lemmon Survey ||  || align=right | 3.2 km || 
|-id=649 bgcolor=#E9E9E9
| 544649 ||  || — || September 3, 2010 || Mount Lemmon || Mount Lemmon Survey ||  || align=right | 1.2 km || 
|-id=650 bgcolor=#E9E9E9
| 544650 ||  || — || September 25, 2014 || Kitt Peak || Spacewatch || ADE || align=right | 1.4 km || 
|-id=651 bgcolor=#E9E9E9
| 544651 ||  || — || November 20, 2014 || Haleakala || Pan-STARRS ||  || align=right | 1.8 km || 
|-id=652 bgcolor=#d6d6d6
| 544652 ||  || — || July 10, 2014 || Haleakala || Pan-STARRS ||  || align=right | 2.1 km || 
|-id=653 bgcolor=#d6d6d6
| 544653 ||  || — || June 24, 2014 || Haleakala || Pan-STARRS ||  || align=right | 3.0 km || 
|-id=654 bgcolor=#fefefe
| 544654 ||  || — || September 16, 2003 || Palomar || NEAT ||  || align=right data-sort-value="0.91" | 910 m || 
|-id=655 bgcolor=#d6d6d6
| 544655 ||  || — || October 25, 2005 || Mount Lemmon || Mount Lemmon Survey ||  || align=right | 2.7 km || 
|-id=656 bgcolor=#d6d6d6
| 544656 ||  || — || December 6, 2011 || Haleakala || Pan-STARRS ||  || align=right | 3.3 km || 
|-id=657 bgcolor=#d6d6d6
| 544657 ||  || — || August 26, 2009 || Catalina || CSS ||  || align=right | 2.0 km || 
|-id=658 bgcolor=#E9E9E9
| 544658 ||  || — || January 17, 2007 || Mount Lemmon || Mount Lemmon Survey ||  || align=right | 1.3 km || 
|-id=659 bgcolor=#E9E9E9
| 544659 ||  || — || September 22, 2014 || Haleakala || Pan-STARRS ||  || align=right data-sort-value="0.81" | 810 m || 
|-id=660 bgcolor=#d6d6d6
| 544660 ||  || — || August 11, 2004 || Siding Spring || SSS ||  || align=right | 4.2 km || 
|-id=661 bgcolor=#E9E9E9
| 544661 ||  || — || July 29, 2005 || Palomar || NEAT ||  || align=right | 1.8 km || 
|-id=662 bgcolor=#E9E9E9
| 544662 ||  || — || November 11, 2010 || Kitt Peak || Spacewatch ||  || align=right | 1.7 km || 
|-id=663 bgcolor=#d6d6d6
| 544663 ||  || — || August 15, 2013 || Haleakala || Pan-STARRS ||  || align=right | 3.0 km || 
|-id=664 bgcolor=#E9E9E9
| 544664 ||  || — || October 16, 2006 || Catalina || CSS ||  || align=right | 1.1 km || 
|-id=665 bgcolor=#d6d6d6
| 544665 ||  || — || November 21, 2014 || Mount Lemmon || Mount Lemmon Survey ||  || align=right | 2.4 km || 
|-id=666 bgcolor=#fefefe
| 544666 ||  || — || August 4, 2002 || Palomar || NEAT ||  || align=right | 1.1 km || 
|-id=667 bgcolor=#E9E9E9
| 544667 ||  || — || October 5, 2005 || Catalina || CSS ||  || align=right | 3.0 km || 
|-id=668 bgcolor=#E9E9E9
| 544668 ||  || — || November 13, 2010 || Mount Lemmon || Mount Lemmon Survey ||  || align=right data-sort-value="0.95" | 950 m || 
|-id=669 bgcolor=#E9E9E9
| 544669 ||  || — || January 27, 2007 || Mount Lemmon || Mount Lemmon Survey ||  || align=right | 1.9 km || 
|-id=670 bgcolor=#E9E9E9
| 544670 ||  || — || September 20, 2009 || Mount Lemmon || Mount Lemmon Survey ||  || align=right | 1.6 km || 
|-id=671 bgcolor=#E9E9E9
| 544671 ||  || — || November 21, 2014 || Haleakala || Pan-STARRS ||  || align=right | 1.9 km || 
|-id=672 bgcolor=#d6d6d6
| 544672 ||  || — || April 22, 2007 || Kitt Peak || Spacewatch ||  || align=right | 2.1 km || 
|-id=673 bgcolor=#d6d6d6
| 544673 ||  || — || July 14, 2013 || Haleakala || Pan-STARRS ||  || align=right | 2.2 km || 
|-id=674 bgcolor=#E9E9E9
| 544674 ||  || — || December 14, 2010 || Kitt Peak || Spacewatch ||  || align=right | 1.5 km || 
|-id=675 bgcolor=#E9E9E9
| 544675 ||  || — || October 23, 2001 || Palomar || NEAT ||  || align=right | 1.3 km || 
|-id=676 bgcolor=#E9E9E9
| 544676 ||  || — || August 27, 2009 || Kitt Peak || Spacewatch ||  || align=right | 1.3 km || 
|-id=677 bgcolor=#E9E9E9
| 544677 ||  || — || September 25, 2009 || Kitt Peak || Spacewatch ||  || align=right | 1.5 km || 
|-id=678 bgcolor=#E9E9E9
| 544678 ||  || — || October 25, 2014 || Mount Lemmon || Mount Lemmon Survey ||  || align=right | 1.7 km || 
|-id=679 bgcolor=#E9E9E9
| 544679 ||  || — || December 14, 2010 || Mount Lemmon || Mount Lemmon Survey ||  || align=right | 2.0 km || 
|-id=680 bgcolor=#E9E9E9
| 544680 ||  || — || May 3, 2008 || Mount Lemmon || Mount Lemmon Survey ||  || align=right | 1.6 km || 
|-id=681 bgcolor=#d6d6d6
| 544681 ||  || — || November 21, 2014 || Haleakala || Pan-STARRS ||  || align=right | 2.9 km || 
|-id=682 bgcolor=#E9E9E9
| 544682 ||  || — || September 20, 2014 || Haleakala || Pan-STARRS ||  || align=right | 2.2 km || 
|-id=683 bgcolor=#E9E9E9
| 544683 ||  || — || September 29, 2009 || Mount Lemmon || Mount Lemmon Survey ||  || align=right | 2.0 km || 
|-id=684 bgcolor=#fefefe
| 544684 ||  || — || March 4, 2005 || Kitt Peak || Spacewatch ||  || align=right data-sort-value="0.92" | 920 m || 
|-id=685 bgcolor=#d6d6d6
| 544685 ||  || — || July 24, 2003 || Wise || D. Polishook ||  || align=right | 2.9 km || 
|-id=686 bgcolor=#d6d6d6
| 544686 ||  || — || May 2, 2006 || Mount Lemmon || Mount Lemmon Survey ||  || align=right | 2.1 km || 
|-id=687 bgcolor=#d6d6d6
| 544687 ||  || — || September 4, 2014 || Haleakala || Pan-STARRS ||  || align=right | 2.8 km || 
|-id=688 bgcolor=#E9E9E9
| 544688 ||  || — || April 27, 2012 || Haleakala || Pan-STARRS ||  || align=right | 2.2 km || 
|-id=689 bgcolor=#E9E9E9
| 544689 ||  || — || June 15, 2005 || Mount Lemmon || Mount Lemmon Survey || (5) || align=right data-sort-value="0.93" | 930 m || 
|-id=690 bgcolor=#E9E9E9
| 544690 ||  || — || December 27, 2005 || Kitt Peak || Spacewatch || MRX || align=right data-sort-value="0.92" | 920 m || 
|-id=691 bgcolor=#E9E9E9
| 544691 ||  || — || September 25, 2009 || Kitt Peak || Spacewatch ||  || align=right | 2.0 km || 
|-id=692 bgcolor=#d6d6d6
| 544692 ||  || — || September 20, 2014 || Haleakala || Pan-STARRS ||  || align=right | 2.2 km || 
|-id=693 bgcolor=#E9E9E9
| 544693 ||  || — || September 12, 2009 || Kitt Peak || Spacewatch ||  || align=right | 1.8 km || 
|-id=694 bgcolor=#d6d6d6
| 544694 ||  || — || April 28, 2012 || Mount Lemmon || Mount Lemmon Survey ||  || align=right | 3.1 km || 
|-id=695 bgcolor=#E9E9E9
| 544695 ||  || — || May 12, 2013 || Mount Lemmon || Mount Lemmon Survey ||  || align=right data-sort-value="0.80" | 800 m || 
|-id=696 bgcolor=#d6d6d6
| 544696 ||  || — || October 2, 2014 || Haleakala || Pan-STARRS ||  || align=right | 2.2 km || 
|-id=697 bgcolor=#d6d6d6
| 544697 ||  || — || July 14, 2013 || Haleakala || Pan-STARRS ||  || align=right | 2.3 km || 
|-id=698 bgcolor=#d6d6d6
| 544698 ||  || — || August 26, 2013 || Haleakala || Pan-STARRS ||  || align=right | 3.6 km || 
|-id=699 bgcolor=#d6d6d6
| 544699 ||  || — || August 14, 2013 || Haleakala || Pan-STARRS ||  || align=right | 3.0 km || 
|-id=700 bgcolor=#d6d6d6
| 544700 ||  || — || September 4, 2014 || Haleakala || Pan-STARRS ||  || align=right | 2.5 km || 
|}

544701–544800 

|-bgcolor=#E9E9E9
| 544701 ||  || — || April 11, 2008 || Mount Lemmon || Mount Lemmon Survey ||  || align=right | 1.0 km || 
|-id=702 bgcolor=#d6d6d6
| 544702 ||  || — || January 30, 2006 || Kitt Peak || Spacewatch ||  || align=right | 2.0 km || 
|-id=703 bgcolor=#d6d6d6
| 544703 ||  || — || October 2, 2014 || Haleakala || Pan-STARRS ||  || align=right | 2.2 km || 
|-id=704 bgcolor=#d6d6d6
| 544704 ||  || — || October 28, 2014 || Haleakala || Pan-STARRS ||  || align=right | 2.6 km || 
|-id=705 bgcolor=#d6d6d6
| 544705 ||  || — || October 12, 2014 || Mount Lemmon || Mount Lemmon Survey ||  || align=right | 2.6 km || 
|-id=706 bgcolor=#d6d6d6
| 544706 ||  || — || August 22, 2014 || Haleakala || Pan-STARRS ||  || align=right | 3.1 km || 
|-id=707 bgcolor=#d6d6d6
| 544707 ||  || — || June 20, 2013 || Haleakala || Pan-STARRS ||  || align=right | 2.7 km || 
|-id=708 bgcolor=#E9E9E9
| 544708 ||  || — || October 29, 2010 || Mount Lemmon || Mount Lemmon Survey ||  || align=right | 1.5 km || 
|-id=709 bgcolor=#E9E9E9
| 544709 ||  || — || January 19, 2012 || Haleakala || Pan-STARRS ||  || align=right | 2.2 km || 
|-id=710 bgcolor=#E9E9E9
| 544710 ||  || — || October 30, 2014 || Mount Lemmon || Mount Lemmon Survey ||  || align=right | 1.0 km || 
|-id=711 bgcolor=#E9E9E9
| 544711 ||  || — || October 21, 2014 || Kitt Peak || Spacewatch ||  || align=right | 1.7 km || 
|-id=712 bgcolor=#d6d6d6
| 544712 ||  || — || February 25, 2011 || Mount Lemmon || Mount Lemmon Survey ||  || align=right | 2.1 km || 
|-id=713 bgcolor=#d6d6d6
| 544713 ||  || — || April 24, 2007 || Mount Lemmon || Mount Lemmon Survey ||  || align=right | 2.7 km || 
|-id=714 bgcolor=#d6d6d6
| 544714 ||  || — || July 15, 2013 || Haleakala || Pan-STARRS || EOS || align=right | 1.6 km || 
|-id=715 bgcolor=#d6d6d6
| 544715 ||  || — || July 13, 2013 || Haleakala || Pan-STARRS ||  || align=right | 2.2 km || 
|-id=716 bgcolor=#E9E9E9
| 544716 ||  || — || March 24, 2012 || Mount Lemmon || Mount Lemmon Survey ||  || align=right | 2.3 km || 
|-id=717 bgcolor=#E9E9E9
| 544717 ||  || — || December 10, 2010 || Mount Lemmon || Mount Lemmon Survey ||  || align=right | 2.0 km || 
|-id=718 bgcolor=#E9E9E9
| 544718 ||  || — || March 29, 2012 || Haleakala || Pan-STARRS ||  || align=right | 1.3 km || 
|-id=719 bgcolor=#E9E9E9
| 544719 ||  || — || November 23, 2006 || Kitt Peak || Spacewatch ||  || align=right data-sort-value="0.86" | 860 m || 
|-id=720 bgcolor=#E9E9E9
| 544720 ||  || — || February 26, 2012 || Kitt Peak || Spacewatch ||  || align=right | 1.1 km || 
|-id=721 bgcolor=#E9E9E9
| 544721 ||  || — || August 14, 2001 || Haleakala || AMOS ||  || align=right | 1.3 km || 
|-id=722 bgcolor=#E9E9E9
| 544722 ||  || — || August 23, 2014 || Haleakala || Pan-STARRS || EUN || align=right | 1.2 km || 
|-id=723 bgcolor=#E9E9E9
| 544723 ||  || — || May 16, 2013 || Mount Lemmon || Mount Lemmon Survey ||  || align=right | 1.00 km || 
|-id=724 bgcolor=#E9E9E9
| 544724 ||  || — || August 31, 2014 || Haleakala || Pan-STARRS ||  || align=right data-sort-value="0.87" | 870 m || 
|-id=725 bgcolor=#E9E9E9
| 544725 ||  || — || March 16, 2007 || Kitt Peak || Spacewatch ||  || align=right | 2.2 km || 
|-id=726 bgcolor=#d6d6d6
| 544726 ||  || — || September 6, 2014 || Mount Lemmon || Mount Lemmon Survey || EOS || align=right | 1.8 km || 
|-id=727 bgcolor=#d6d6d6
| 544727 ||  || — || April 17, 2012 || Kitt Peak || Spacewatch ||  || align=right | 3.0 km || 
|-id=728 bgcolor=#E9E9E9
| 544728 ||  || — || May 14, 2012 || Mount Lemmon || Mount Lemmon Survey ||  || align=right data-sort-value="0.94" | 940 m || 
|-id=729 bgcolor=#E9E9E9
| 544729 ||  || — || March 24, 2012 || Mount Lemmon || Mount Lemmon Survey ||  || align=right | 1.2 km || 
|-id=730 bgcolor=#d6d6d6
| 544730 ||  || — || June 13, 2012 || Haleakala || Pan-STARRS ||  || align=right | 2.5 km || 
|-id=731 bgcolor=#E9E9E9
| 544731 ||  || — || August 31, 2014 || Haleakala || Pan-STARRS ||  || align=right | 1.1 km || 
|-id=732 bgcolor=#E9E9E9
| 544732 ||  || — || July 28, 2009 || Kitt Peak || Spacewatch ||  || align=right | 1.7 km || 
|-id=733 bgcolor=#d6d6d6
| 544733 ||  || — || March 2, 2011 || Catalina || CSS ||  || align=right | 2.7 km || 
|-id=734 bgcolor=#E9E9E9
| 544734 ||  || — || July 1, 2013 || Haleakala || Pan-STARRS ||  || align=right | 2.3 km || 
|-id=735 bgcolor=#E9E9E9
| 544735 ||  || — || November 25, 2005 || Catalina || CSS ||  || align=right | 2.3 km || 
|-id=736 bgcolor=#E9E9E9
| 544736 ||  || — || November 30, 2010 || Mount Lemmon || Mount Lemmon Survey ||  || align=right | 1.5 km || 
|-id=737 bgcolor=#E9E9E9
| 544737 ||  || — || December 14, 2010 || Mount Lemmon || Mount Lemmon Survey ||  || align=right | 1.4 km || 
|-id=738 bgcolor=#E9E9E9
| 544738 ||  || — || September 4, 2014 || Haleakala || Pan-STARRS ||  || align=right | 1.4 km || 
|-id=739 bgcolor=#d6d6d6
| 544739 ||  || — || December 2, 2005 || Mauna Kea || Mauna Kea Obs. ||  || align=right | 2.6 km || 
|-id=740 bgcolor=#d6d6d6
| 544740 ||  || — || March 11, 2011 || Kitt Peak || Spacewatch ||  || align=right | 3.0 km || 
|-id=741 bgcolor=#d6d6d6
| 544741 ||  || — || March 4, 2005 || Kitt Peak || Spacewatch ||  || align=right | 3.2 km || 
|-id=742 bgcolor=#d6d6d6
| 544742 ||  || — || March 4, 2010 || Kitt Peak || Spacewatch ||  || align=right | 2.4 km || 
|-id=743 bgcolor=#d6d6d6
| 544743 ||  || — || February 9, 2010 || Kitt Peak || Spacewatch ||  || align=right | 2.6 km || 
|-id=744 bgcolor=#E9E9E9
| 544744 ||  || — || April 18, 2007 || Mount Lemmon || Mount Lemmon Survey ||  || align=right | 2.8 km || 
|-id=745 bgcolor=#fefefe
| 544745 ||  || — || November 23, 2014 || Haleakala || Pan-STARRS || H || align=right data-sort-value="0.60" | 600 m || 
|-id=746 bgcolor=#d6d6d6
| 544746 ||  || — || December 10, 2002 || Palomar || NEAT ||  || align=right | 3.1 km || 
|-id=747 bgcolor=#FA8072
| 544747 ||  || — || October 20, 2011 || Haleakala || Pan-STARRS || H || align=right data-sort-value="0.75" | 750 m || 
|-id=748 bgcolor=#E9E9E9
| 544748 ||  || — || October 6, 2005 || Bergisch Gladbach || W. Bickel ||  || align=right | 1.5 km || 
|-id=749 bgcolor=#d6d6d6
| 544749 ||  || — || November 24, 2014 || Mount Lemmon || Mount Lemmon Survey ||  || align=right | 2.9 km || 
|-id=750 bgcolor=#E9E9E9
| 544750 ||  || — || August 30, 2005 || Kitt Peak || Spacewatch ||  || align=right | 1.4 km || 
|-id=751 bgcolor=#E9E9E9
| 544751 ||  || — || August 29, 2005 || Palomar || NEAT ||  || align=right | 1.6 km || 
|-id=752 bgcolor=#E9E9E9
| 544752 ||  || — || November 25, 2014 || Mount Lemmon || Mount Lemmon Survey ||  || align=right | 1.7 km || 
|-id=753 bgcolor=#E9E9E9
| 544753 ||  || — || January 30, 2011 || Mount Lemmon || Mount Lemmon Survey ||  || align=right | 1.7 km || 
|-id=754 bgcolor=#fefefe
| 544754 ||  || — || November 26, 2014 || Mount Lemmon || Mount Lemmon Survey || H || align=right data-sort-value="0.71" | 710 m || 
|-id=755 bgcolor=#FA8072
| 544755 ||  || — || December 10, 2009 || Mount Lemmon || Mount Lemmon Survey || H || align=right data-sort-value="0.65" | 650 m || 
|-id=756 bgcolor=#FA8072
| 544756 ||  || — || December 27, 1999 || Kitt Peak || Spacewatch || H || align=right data-sort-value="0.75" | 750 m || 
|-id=757 bgcolor=#fefefe
| 544757 ||  || — || November 27, 2014 || Mount Lemmon || Mount Lemmon Survey || H || align=right data-sort-value="0.78" | 780 m || 
|-id=758 bgcolor=#fefefe
| 544758 ||  || — || November 16, 2009 || Kitt Peak || Spacewatch || H || align=right data-sort-value="0.62" | 620 m || 
|-id=759 bgcolor=#E9E9E9
| 544759 ||  || — || January 23, 2011 || Les Engarouines || L. Bernasconi ||  || align=right | 2.0 km || 
|-id=760 bgcolor=#FA8072
| 544760 ||  || — || July 25, 2011 || Haleakala || Pan-STARRS || H || align=right data-sort-value="0.71" | 710 m || 
|-id=761 bgcolor=#fefefe
| 544761 ||  || — || October 3, 2014 || Haleakala || Pan-STARRS || H || align=right data-sort-value="0.57" | 570 m || 
|-id=762 bgcolor=#E9E9E9
| 544762 ||  || — || March 15, 2007 || Kitt Peak || Spacewatch ||  || align=right | 2.0 km || 
|-id=763 bgcolor=#d6d6d6
| 544763 ||  || — || September 5, 2008 || Kitt Peak || Spacewatch ||  || align=right | 2.7 km || 
|-id=764 bgcolor=#d6d6d6
| 544764 ||  || — || July 16, 2013 || Piszkesteto || K. Sárneczky, E. Bányai ||  || align=right | 3.3 km || 
|-id=765 bgcolor=#E9E9E9
| 544765 ||  || — || August 16, 2009 || Kitt Peak || Spacewatch ||  || align=right | 2.1 km || 
|-id=766 bgcolor=#d6d6d6
| 544766 ||  || — || September 26, 2008 || Kitt Peak || Spacewatch ||  || align=right | 2.1 km || 
|-id=767 bgcolor=#E9E9E9
| 544767 ||  || — || December 29, 2005 || Kitt Peak || Spacewatch ||  || align=right | 1.8 km || 
|-id=768 bgcolor=#E9E9E9
| 544768 ||  || — || November 22, 2014 || Mount Lemmon || Mount Lemmon Survey ||  || align=right | 2.2 km || 
|-id=769 bgcolor=#d6d6d6
| 544769 ||  || — || October 30, 2014 || Mount Lemmon || Mount Lemmon Survey ||  || align=right | 3.5 km || 
|-id=770 bgcolor=#d6d6d6
| 544770 ||  || — || October 10, 2008 || Mount Lemmon || Mount Lemmon Survey ||  || align=right | 2.4 km || 
|-id=771 bgcolor=#d6d6d6
| 544771 ||  || — || February 10, 2011 || Mount Lemmon || Mount Lemmon Survey ||  || align=right | 2.0 km || 
|-id=772 bgcolor=#d6d6d6
| 544772 ||  || — || September 24, 2008 || Mount Lemmon || Mount Lemmon Survey ||  || align=right | 2.8 km || 
|-id=773 bgcolor=#E9E9E9
| 544773 ||  || — || July 1, 2013 || Haleakala || Pan-STARRS ||  || align=right | 2.4 km || 
|-id=774 bgcolor=#d6d6d6
| 544774 ||  || — || November 22, 2014 || Haleakala || Pan-STARRS ||  || align=right | 4.1 km || 
|-id=775 bgcolor=#d6d6d6
| 544775 ||  || — || April 4, 2005 || Mount Lemmon || Mount Lemmon Survey ||  || align=right | 2.7 km || 
|-id=776 bgcolor=#E9E9E9
| 544776 ||  || — || July 15, 2004 || Siding Spring || SSS ||  || align=right | 2.5 km || 
|-id=777 bgcolor=#d6d6d6
| 544777 ||  || — || February 6, 2005 || Uccle || E. W. Elst, H. Debehogne ||  || align=right | 3.1 km || 
|-id=778 bgcolor=#E9E9E9
| 544778 ||  || — || April 16, 2012 || Haleakala || Pan-STARRS ||  || align=right | 2.3 km || 
|-id=779 bgcolor=#d6d6d6
| 544779 ||  || — || October 22, 2014 || Mount Lemmon || Mount Lemmon Survey ||  || align=right | 2.3 km || 
|-id=780 bgcolor=#d6d6d6
| 544780 ||  || — || February 27, 2006 || Mount Lemmon || Mount Lemmon Survey ||  || align=right | 1.8 km || 
|-id=781 bgcolor=#E9E9E9
| 544781 ||  || — || April 27, 2012 || Haleakala || Pan-STARRS ||  || align=right | 2.0 km || 
|-id=782 bgcolor=#E9E9E9
| 544782 ||  || — || January 10, 2011 || Mount Lemmon || Mount Lemmon Survey ||  || align=right | 1.9 km || 
|-id=783 bgcolor=#E9E9E9
| 544783 ||  || — || October 3, 2005 || Catalina || CSS ||  || align=right | 1.5 km || 
|-id=784 bgcolor=#E9E9E9
| 544784 ||  || — || August 25, 2014 || Haleakala || Pan-STARRS ||  || align=right | 1.8 km || 
|-id=785 bgcolor=#E9E9E9
| 544785 ||  || — || November 10, 2005 || Kitt Peak || Spacewatch ||  || align=right | 2.2 km || 
|-id=786 bgcolor=#E9E9E9
| 544786 ||  || — || November 15, 2010 || Mount Lemmon || Mount Lemmon Survey ||  || align=right | 1.3 km || 
|-id=787 bgcolor=#E9E9E9
| 544787 ||  || — || December 13, 2006 || Mount Lemmon || Mount Lemmon Survey ||  || align=right | 2.1 km || 
|-id=788 bgcolor=#d6d6d6
| 544788 ||  || — || October 1, 2003 || Kitt Peak || Spacewatch ||  || align=right | 2.5 km || 
|-id=789 bgcolor=#d6d6d6
| 544789 ||  || — || December 18, 2009 || Mount Lemmon || Mount Lemmon Survey ||  || align=right | 2.3 km || 
|-id=790 bgcolor=#d6d6d6
| 544790 ||  || — || December 18, 2004 || Mount Lemmon || Mount Lemmon Survey || EOS || align=right | 2.0 km || 
|-id=791 bgcolor=#fefefe
| 544791 ||  || — || November 24, 2014 || Mount Lemmon || Mount Lemmon Survey || H || align=right data-sort-value="0.75" | 750 m || 
|-id=792 bgcolor=#E9E9E9
| 544792 ||  || — || July 15, 2005 || Kitt Peak || Spacewatch ||  || align=right | 1.9 km || 
|-id=793 bgcolor=#E9E9E9
| 544793 ||  || — || August 25, 2005 || Palomar || NEAT ||  || align=right | 1.4 km || 
|-id=794 bgcolor=#E9E9E9
| 544794 ||  || — || January 2, 2011 || Mount Lemmon || Mount Lemmon Survey ||  || align=right | 1.3 km || 
|-id=795 bgcolor=#E9E9E9
| 544795 ||  || — || October 30, 2014 || Mount Lemmon || Mount Lemmon Survey ||  || align=right | 1.5 km || 
|-id=796 bgcolor=#d6d6d6
| 544796 ||  || — || September 21, 2003 || Kitt Peak || Spacewatch ||  || align=right | 2.2 km || 
|-id=797 bgcolor=#E9E9E9
| 544797 ||  || — || March 10, 2008 || Kitt Peak || Spacewatch ||  || align=right | 1.6 km || 
|-id=798 bgcolor=#E9E9E9
| 544798 ||  || — || January 3, 2012 || Mount Lemmon || Mount Lemmon Survey ||  || align=right | 1.7 km || 
|-id=799 bgcolor=#d6d6d6
| 544799 ||  || — || January 30, 2011 || Haleakala || Pan-STARRS ||  || align=right | 2.4 km || 
|-id=800 bgcolor=#E9E9E9
| 544800 ||  || — || October 30, 2014 || Haleakala || Pan-STARRS ||  || align=right | 1.9 km || 
|}

544801–544900 

|-bgcolor=#E9E9E9
| 544801 ||  || — || November 25, 2014 || Mount Lemmon || Mount Lemmon Survey ||  || align=right | 1.5 km || 
|-id=802 bgcolor=#E9E9E9
| 544802 ||  || — || October 7, 2014 || Haleakala || Pan-STARRS ||  || align=right | 1.9 km || 
|-id=803 bgcolor=#d6d6d6
| 544803 ||  || — || November 25, 2014 || Haleakala || Pan-STARRS ||  || align=right | 2.6 km || 
|-id=804 bgcolor=#E9E9E9
| 544804 ||  || — || September 4, 2014 || Haleakala || Pan-STARRS ||  || align=right | 1.6 km || 
|-id=805 bgcolor=#E9E9E9
| 544805 ||  || — || November 16, 2014 || Mount Lemmon || Mount Lemmon Survey ||  || align=right | 1.3 km || 
|-id=806 bgcolor=#d6d6d6
| 544806 ||  || — || October 31, 2014 || Mount Lemmon || Mount Lemmon Survey ||  || align=right | 2.4 km || 
|-id=807 bgcolor=#d6d6d6
| 544807 ||  || — || November 26, 2014 || Haleakala || Pan-STARRS ||  || align=right | 2.2 km || 
|-id=808 bgcolor=#d6d6d6
| 544808 ||  || — || October 22, 2014 || Mount Lemmon || Mount Lemmon Survey ||  || align=right | 2.2 km || 
|-id=809 bgcolor=#E9E9E9
| 544809 ||  || — || November 19, 2014 || Mount Lemmon || Mount Lemmon Survey ||  || align=right | 1.1 km || 
|-id=810 bgcolor=#E9E9E9
| 544810 ||  || — || October 21, 2005 || Palomar || NEAT ||  || align=right | 2.0 km || 
|-id=811 bgcolor=#fefefe
| 544811 ||  || — || November 26, 2014 || Haleakala || Pan-STARRS || H || align=right data-sort-value="0.81" | 810 m || 
|-id=812 bgcolor=#d6d6d6
| 544812 ||  || — || November 26, 2014 || Haleakala || Pan-STARRS ||  || align=right | 3.1 km || 
|-id=813 bgcolor=#E9E9E9
| 544813 ||  || — || January 17, 2007 || Kitt Peak || Spacewatch ||  || align=right | 1.5 km || 
|-id=814 bgcolor=#d6d6d6
| 544814 ||  || — || October 24, 2003 || Kitt Peak || Spacewatch ||  || align=right | 2.6 km || 
|-id=815 bgcolor=#d6d6d6
| 544815 ||  || — || November 26, 2014 || Haleakala || Pan-STARRS ||  || align=right | 3.9 km || 
|-id=816 bgcolor=#E9E9E9
| 544816 ||  || — || May 15, 2012 || Mount Lemmon || Mount Lemmon Survey ||  || align=right data-sort-value="0.88" | 880 m || 
|-id=817 bgcolor=#fefefe
| 544817 ||  || — || November 26, 2014 || Haleakala || Pan-STARRS || H || align=right data-sort-value="0.49" | 490 m || 
|-id=818 bgcolor=#E9E9E9
| 544818 ||  || — || January 13, 2011 || Kitt Peak || Spacewatch ||  || align=right | 1.9 km || 
|-id=819 bgcolor=#d6d6d6
| 544819 ||  || — || March 3, 2000 || Kitt Peak || Spacewatch ||  || align=right | 2.2 km || 
|-id=820 bgcolor=#d6d6d6
| 544820 ||  || — || October 28, 2008 || Catalina || CSS ||  || align=right | 2.8 km || 
|-id=821 bgcolor=#d6d6d6
| 544821 ||  || — || September 3, 2008 || Kitt Peak || Spacewatch ||  || align=right | 2.6 km || 
|-id=822 bgcolor=#E9E9E9
| 544822 ||  || — || November 24, 2014 || Kitt Peak || Spacewatch ||  || align=right | 1.3 km || 
|-id=823 bgcolor=#E9E9E9
| 544823 ||  || — || September 4, 2014 || Haleakala || Pan-STARRS ||  || align=right | 2.5 km || 
|-id=824 bgcolor=#E9E9E9
| 544824 ||  || — || November 23, 2014 || Catalina || CSS ||  || align=right | 1.6 km || 
|-id=825 bgcolor=#E9E9E9
| 544825 ||  || — || November 26, 2014 || Haleakala || Pan-STARRS ||  || align=right | 1.9 km || 
|-id=826 bgcolor=#d6d6d6
| 544826 ||  || — || November 26, 2014 || Haleakala || Pan-STARRS ||  || align=right | 2.6 km || 
|-id=827 bgcolor=#E9E9E9
| 544827 ||  || — || March 5, 2011 || Mount Lemmon || Mount Lemmon Survey ||  || align=right | 2.3 km || 
|-id=828 bgcolor=#d6d6d6
| 544828 ||  || — || December 17, 2009 || Mount Lemmon || Mount Lemmon Survey ||  || align=right | 2.0 km || 
|-id=829 bgcolor=#E9E9E9
| 544829 ||  || — || November 26, 2014 || Haleakala || Pan-STARRS ||  || align=right | 2.1 km || 
|-id=830 bgcolor=#E9E9E9
| 544830 ||  || — || September 15, 2009 || Kitt Peak || Spacewatch ||  || align=right | 2.2 km || 
|-id=831 bgcolor=#E9E9E9
| 544831 ||  || — || November 26, 2014 || Haleakala || Pan-STARRS ||  || align=right | 1.1 km || 
|-id=832 bgcolor=#d6d6d6
| 544832 ||  || — || October 2, 2014 || Haleakala || Pan-STARRS ||  || align=right | 2.7 km || 
|-id=833 bgcolor=#d6d6d6
| 544833 ||  || — || March 15, 2004 || Kitt Peak || Spacewatch ||  || align=right | 2.8 km || 
|-id=834 bgcolor=#E9E9E9
| 544834 ||  || — || November 26, 2014 || Haleakala || Pan-STARRS ||  || align=right | 2.7 km || 
|-id=835 bgcolor=#d6d6d6
| 544835 ||  || — || January 11, 2010 || Kitt Peak || Spacewatch ||  || align=right | 2.9 km || 
|-id=836 bgcolor=#d6d6d6
| 544836 ||  || — || August 14, 2013 || Haleakala || Pan-STARRS ||  || align=right | 2.3 km || 
|-id=837 bgcolor=#d6d6d6
| 544837 ||  || — || November 26, 2014 || Haleakala || Pan-STARRS ||  || align=right | 3.0 km || 
|-id=838 bgcolor=#d6d6d6
| 544838 ||  || — || September 30, 2003 || Kitt Peak || Spacewatch ||  || align=right | 3.7 km || 
|-id=839 bgcolor=#d6d6d6
| 544839 ||  || — || December 1, 2008 || Kitt Peak || Spacewatch ||  || align=right | 2.0 km || 
|-id=840 bgcolor=#d6d6d6
| 544840 ||  || — || October 3, 2014 || Mount Lemmon || Mount Lemmon Survey ||  || align=right | 2.7 km || 
|-id=841 bgcolor=#E9E9E9
| 544841 ||  || — || March 17, 2004 || Siding Spring || SSS ||  || align=right | 1.5 km || 
|-id=842 bgcolor=#E9E9E9
| 544842 ||  || — || July 14, 2013 || Haleakala || Pan-STARRS ||  || align=right | 1.8 km || 
|-id=843 bgcolor=#E9E9E9
| 544843 ||  || — || October 3, 2014 || Mount Lemmon || Mount Lemmon Survey ||  || align=right | 1.2 km || 
|-id=844 bgcolor=#d6d6d6
| 544844 ||  || — || November 21, 2014 || Haleakala || Pan-STARRS ||  || align=right | 2.4 km || 
|-id=845 bgcolor=#E9E9E9
| 544845 ||  || — || March 9, 2007 || Mount Lemmon || Mount Lemmon Survey ||  || align=right | 2.1 km || 
|-id=846 bgcolor=#E9E9E9
| 544846 ||  || — || November 27, 2014 || Haleakala || Pan-STARRS ||  || align=right | 1.3 km || 
|-id=847 bgcolor=#E9E9E9
| 544847 ||  || — || August 15, 2009 || Kitt Peak || Spacewatch ||  || align=right | 2.0 km || 
|-id=848 bgcolor=#d6d6d6
| 544848 ||  || — || December 16, 2009 || Mount Lemmon || Mount Lemmon Survey ||  || align=right | 2.2 km || 
|-id=849 bgcolor=#E9E9E9
| 544849 ||  || — || July 1, 2013 || Haleakala || Pan-STARRS ||  || align=right | 1.8 km || 
|-id=850 bgcolor=#E9E9E9
| 544850 ||  || — || February 29, 2004 || Kitt Peak || Spacewatch ||  || align=right data-sort-value="0.98" | 980 m || 
|-id=851 bgcolor=#d6d6d6
| 544851 ||  || — || November 4, 2014 || Mount Lemmon || Mount Lemmon Survey ||  || align=right | 2.8 km || 
|-id=852 bgcolor=#d6d6d6
| 544852 ||  || — || November 24, 2014 || Mount Lemmon || Mount Lemmon Survey ||  || align=right | 2.8 km || 
|-id=853 bgcolor=#E9E9E9
| 544853 ||  || — || November 27, 2014 || Haleakala || Pan-STARRS ||  || align=right | 1.7 km || 
|-id=854 bgcolor=#E9E9E9
| 544854 ||  || — || January 10, 2011 || Mount Lemmon || Mount Lemmon Survey ||  || align=right | 2.0 km || 
|-id=855 bgcolor=#E9E9E9
| 544855 ||  || — || October 2, 2005 || Mount Lemmon || Mount Lemmon Survey ||  || align=right | 1.4 km || 
|-id=856 bgcolor=#E9E9E9
| 544856 ||  || — || September 29, 2005 || Kitt Peak || Spacewatch ||  || align=right | 1.3 km || 
|-id=857 bgcolor=#E9E9E9
| 544857 ||  || — || May 1, 2003 || Kitt Peak || Spacewatch ||  || align=right | 1.8 km || 
|-id=858 bgcolor=#E9E9E9
| 544858 ||  || — || August 26, 2001 || Haleakala || AMOS ||  || align=right | 1.1 km || 
|-id=859 bgcolor=#E9E9E9
| 544859 ||  || — || February 19, 2012 || Mount Graham || R. P. Boyle ||  || align=right data-sort-value="0.99" | 990 m || 
|-id=860 bgcolor=#E9E9E9
| 544860 ||  || — || January 15, 2007 || Catalina || CSS ||  || align=right | 2.1 km || 
|-id=861 bgcolor=#fefefe
| 544861 ||  || — || March 18, 2001 || Kitt Peak || Spacewatch ||  || align=right data-sort-value="0.87" | 870 m || 
|-id=862 bgcolor=#d6d6d6
| 544862 ||  || — || November 20, 2014 || Mount Lemmon || Mount Lemmon Survey ||  || align=right | 2.9 km || 
|-id=863 bgcolor=#d6d6d6
| 544863 ||  || — || August 15, 2013 || Haleakala || Pan-STARRS ||  || align=right | 2.1 km || 
|-id=864 bgcolor=#E9E9E9
| 544864 ||  || — || February 6, 2007 || Mount Lemmon || Mount Lemmon Survey ||  || align=right | 1.6 km || 
|-id=865 bgcolor=#E9E9E9
| 544865 ||  || — || November 27, 2014 || Haleakala || Pan-STARRS ||  || align=right | 1.9 km || 
|-id=866 bgcolor=#E9E9E9
| 544866 ||  || — || July 13, 2013 || Haleakala || Pan-STARRS ||  || align=right | 1.3 km || 
|-id=867 bgcolor=#E9E9E9
| 544867 ||  || — || September 13, 2005 || Kitt Peak || Spacewatch ||  || align=right | 1.2 km || 
|-id=868 bgcolor=#E9E9E9
| 544868 ||  || — || November 27, 2014 || Haleakala || Pan-STARRS ||  || align=right | 1.6 km || 
|-id=869 bgcolor=#d6d6d6
| 544869 ||  || — || April 21, 2013 || Haleakala || Pan-STARRS ||  || align=right | 2.8 km || 
|-id=870 bgcolor=#d6d6d6
| 544870 ||  || — || July 29, 2008 || Mount Lemmon || Mount Lemmon Survey ||  || align=right | 2.9 km || 
|-id=871 bgcolor=#E9E9E9
| 544871 ||  || — || November 27, 2014 || Haleakala || Pan-STARRS ||  || align=right | 1.4 km || 
|-id=872 bgcolor=#E9E9E9
| 544872 ||  || — || October 2, 2014 || Haleakala || Pan-STARRS ||  || align=right | 1.3 km || 
|-id=873 bgcolor=#E9E9E9
| 544873 ||  || — || January 14, 2011 || Kitt Peak || Spacewatch ||  || align=right | 1.3 km || 
|-id=874 bgcolor=#E9E9E9
| 544874 ||  || — || September 13, 2005 || Kitt Peak || Spacewatch ||  || align=right data-sort-value="0.97" | 970 m || 
|-id=875 bgcolor=#E9E9E9
| 544875 ||  || — || September 24, 2009 || Mount Lemmon || Mount Lemmon Survey ||  || align=right | 1.9 km || 
|-id=876 bgcolor=#E9E9E9
| 544876 ||  || — || January 10, 2007 || Mount Lemmon || Mount Lemmon Survey ||  || align=right | 1.3 km || 
|-id=877 bgcolor=#E9E9E9
| 544877 ||  || — || November 17, 2014 || Haleakala || Pan-STARRS ||  || align=right | 1.2 km || 
|-id=878 bgcolor=#E9E9E9
| 544878 ||  || — || August 29, 2005 || Palomar || NEAT || EUN || align=right | 1.1 km || 
|-id=879 bgcolor=#d6d6d6
| 544879 ||  || — || July 15, 2013 || Haleakala || Pan-STARRS ||  || align=right | 2.0 km || 
|-id=880 bgcolor=#E9E9E9
| 544880 ||  || — || November 27, 2014 || Haleakala || Pan-STARRS ||  || align=right data-sort-value="0.87" | 870 m || 
|-id=881 bgcolor=#E9E9E9
| 544881 ||  || — || November 26, 2014 || Kitt Peak || Spacewatch ||  || align=right | 1.2 km || 
|-id=882 bgcolor=#E9E9E9
| 544882 ||  || — || November 22, 2014 || Mount Lemmon || Mount Lemmon Survey ||  || align=right | 1.6 km || 
|-id=883 bgcolor=#d6d6d6
| 544883 ||  || — || April 24, 2007 || Mount Lemmon || Mount Lemmon Survey ||  || align=right | 3.0 km || 
|-id=884 bgcolor=#E9E9E9
| 544884 ||  || — || September 1, 2005 || Kitt Peak || Spacewatch ||  || align=right data-sort-value="0.90" | 900 m || 
|-id=885 bgcolor=#E9E9E9
| 544885 ||  || — || October 22, 2014 || Mount Lemmon || Mount Lemmon Survey ||  || align=right | 1.9 km || 
|-id=886 bgcolor=#d6d6d6
| 544886 ||  || — || October 3, 2013 || Mount Lemmon || Mount Lemmon Survey ||  || align=right | 2.9 km || 
|-id=887 bgcolor=#E9E9E9
| 544887 ||  || — || November 29, 1999 || Kitt Peak || Spacewatch ||  || align=right | 2.1 km || 
|-id=888 bgcolor=#E9E9E9
| 544888 ||  || — || July 7, 2005 || Kitt Peak || Spacewatch ||  || align=right data-sort-value="0.88" | 880 m || 
|-id=889 bgcolor=#E9E9E9
| 544889 ||  || — || July 29, 2001 || Palomar || NEAT || KON || align=right | 2.9 km || 
|-id=890 bgcolor=#E9E9E9
| 544890 ||  || — || January 27, 2007 || Mount Lemmon || Mount Lemmon Survey ||  || align=right | 1.2 km || 
|-id=891 bgcolor=#d6d6d6
| 544891 ||  || — || November 28, 2014 || Mount Lemmon || Mount Lemmon Survey ||  || align=right | 3.0 km || 
|-id=892 bgcolor=#d6d6d6
| 544892 ||  || — || July 3, 2013 || Oukaimeden || M. Ory ||  || align=right | 3.4 km || 
|-id=893 bgcolor=#E9E9E9
| 544893 ||  || — || July 13, 2001 || Palomar || NEAT ||  || align=right | 1.5 km || 
|-id=894 bgcolor=#E9E9E9
| 544894 ||  || — || August 15, 2013 || Haleakala || Pan-STARRS ||  || align=right data-sort-value="0.96" | 960 m || 
|-id=895 bgcolor=#E9E9E9
| 544895 ||  || — || March 29, 2012 || Kitt Peak || Spacewatch ||  || align=right | 1.0 km || 
|-id=896 bgcolor=#E9E9E9
| 544896 ||  || — || January 30, 2011 || Mount Lemmon || Mount Lemmon Survey ||  || align=right | 1.2 km || 
|-id=897 bgcolor=#d6d6d6
| 544897 ||  || — || November 28, 2014 || Haleakala || Pan-STARRS ||  || align=right | 2.5 km || 
|-id=898 bgcolor=#d6d6d6
| 544898 ||  || — || November 28, 2014 || Haleakala || Pan-STARRS ||  || align=right | 2.8 km || 
|-id=899 bgcolor=#E9E9E9
| 544899 ||  || — || September 6, 2008 || Mount Lemmon || Mount Lemmon Survey ||  || align=right | 1.7 km || 
|-id=900 bgcolor=#d6d6d6
| 544900 ||  || — || February 14, 2010 || Kitt Peak || Spacewatch || EOS || align=right | 2.1 km || 
|}

544901–545000 

|-bgcolor=#d6d6d6
| 544901 ||  || — || October 2, 2013 || Haleakala || Pan-STARRS ||  || align=right | 2.4 km || 
|-id=902 bgcolor=#d6d6d6
| 544902 ||  || — || November 28, 2014 || Haleakala || Pan-STARRS ||  || align=right | 2.5 km || 
|-id=903 bgcolor=#E9E9E9
| 544903 ||  || — || November 28, 2014 || Haleakala || Pan-STARRS ||  || align=right | 1.9 km || 
|-id=904 bgcolor=#d6d6d6
| 544904 ||  || — || October 23, 2013 || Haleakala || Pan-STARRS ||  || align=right | 2.8 km || 
|-id=905 bgcolor=#E9E9E9
| 544905 ||  || — || November 16, 2014 || Catalina || CSS ||  || align=right | 1.4 km || 
|-id=906 bgcolor=#d6d6d6
| 544906 ||  || — || May 25, 2007 || Mount Lemmon || Mount Lemmon Survey ||  || align=right | 2.8 km || 
|-id=907 bgcolor=#d6d6d6
| 544907 ||  || — || June 7, 2013 || Mount Lemmon || Mount Lemmon Survey ||  || align=right | 4.0 km || 
|-id=908 bgcolor=#E9E9E9
| 544908 ||  || — || November 27, 2014 || Haleakala || Pan-STARRS ||  || align=right | 2.2 km || 
|-id=909 bgcolor=#E9E9E9
| 544909 ||  || — || January 29, 2011 || Kitt Peak || Spacewatch ||  || align=right | 1.7 km || 
|-id=910 bgcolor=#E9E9E9
| 544910 ||  || — || August 31, 2005 || Palomar || NEAT ||  || align=right | 1.6 km || 
|-id=911 bgcolor=#E9E9E9
| 544911 ||  || — || October 22, 2005 || Kitt Peak || Spacewatch ||  || align=right | 1.4 km || 
|-id=912 bgcolor=#d6d6d6
| 544912 ||  || — || November 21, 2014 || Haleakala || Pan-STARRS ||  || align=right | 2.8 km || 
|-id=913 bgcolor=#d6d6d6
| 544913 ||  || — || November 26, 2014 || Haleakala || Pan-STARRS ||  || align=right | 3.6 km || 
|-id=914 bgcolor=#E9E9E9
| 544914 ||  || — || November 24, 2014 || Mount Lemmon || Mount Lemmon Survey ||  || align=right | 1.5 km || 
|-id=915 bgcolor=#d6d6d6
| 544915 ||  || — || September 4, 2014 || Haleakala || Pan-STARRS ||  || align=right | 2.6 km || 
|-id=916 bgcolor=#E9E9E9
| 544916 ||  || — || February 10, 2007 || Mount Lemmon || Mount Lemmon Survey ||  || align=right | 1.0 km || 
|-id=917 bgcolor=#E9E9E9
| 544917 ||  || — || April 14, 2008 || Mount Lemmon || Mount Lemmon Survey ||  || align=right | 1.4 km || 
|-id=918 bgcolor=#E9E9E9
| 544918 ||  || — || March 10, 2007 || Mount Lemmon || Mount Lemmon Survey ||  || align=right | 1.6 km || 
|-id=919 bgcolor=#E9E9E9
| 544919 ||  || — || March 14, 2007 || Mount Lemmon || Mount Lemmon Survey ||  || align=right | 1.9 km || 
|-id=920 bgcolor=#d6d6d6
| 544920 ||  || — || November 4, 2014 || Haleakala || Pan-STARRS ||  || align=right | 2.2 km || 
|-id=921 bgcolor=#d6d6d6
| 544921 ||  || — || July 16, 2007 || Siding Spring || SSS ||  || align=right | 4.2 km || 
|-id=922 bgcolor=#E9E9E9
| 544922 ||  || — || January 29, 2003 || Palomar || NEAT ||  || align=right | 1.3 km || 
|-id=923 bgcolor=#d6d6d6
| 544923 ||  || — || November 9, 2013 || Haleakala || Pan-STARRS ||  || align=right | 3.2 km || 
|-id=924 bgcolor=#fefefe
| 544924 ||  || — || November 30, 2014 || Haleakala || Pan-STARRS || H || align=right data-sort-value="0.68" | 680 m || 
|-id=925 bgcolor=#d6d6d6
| 544925 ||  || — || November 26, 2014 || Haleakala || Pan-STARRS ||  || align=right | 2.7 km || 
|-id=926 bgcolor=#d6d6d6
| 544926 ||  || — || August 24, 2007 || Kitt Peak || Spacewatch ||  || align=right | 2.8 km || 
|-id=927 bgcolor=#d6d6d6
| 544927 ||  || — || August 7, 2013 || ESA OGS || ESA OGS || Tj (2.97) || align=right | 3.3 km || 
|-id=928 bgcolor=#d6d6d6
| 544928 ||  || — || November 30, 2014 || Haleakala || Pan-STARRS ||  || align=right | 2.8 km || 
|-id=929 bgcolor=#E9E9E9
| 544929 ||  || — || January 28, 2007 || Mount Lemmon || Mount Lemmon Survey ||  || align=right | 1.3 km || 
|-id=930 bgcolor=#E9E9E9
| 544930 ||  || — || May 15, 2013 || Haleakala || Pan-STARRS ||  || align=right | 1.2 km || 
|-id=931 bgcolor=#E9E9E9
| 544931 ||  || — || August 10, 2001 || Palomar || NEAT ||  || align=right | 1.2 km || 
|-id=932 bgcolor=#d6d6d6
| 544932 ||  || — || September 20, 2014 || Haleakala || Pan-STARRS ||  || align=right | 2.7 km || 
|-id=933 bgcolor=#E9E9E9
| 544933 ||  || — || July 5, 2005 || Mount Lemmon || Mount Lemmon Survey ||  || align=right | 1.4 km || 
|-id=934 bgcolor=#E9E9E9
| 544934 ||  || — || January 3, 1997 || Kitt Peak || Spacewatch ||  || align=right | 1.8 km || 
|-id=935 bgcolor=#E9E9E9
| 544935 ||  || — || September 23, 2014 || Haleakala || Pan-STARRS ||  || align=right data-sort-value="0.85" | 850 m || 
|-id=936 bgcolor=#E9E9E9
| 544936 ||  || — || November 22, 2006 || Mount Lemmon || Mount Lemmon Survey ||  || align=right | 1.6 km || 
|-id=937 bgcolor=#fefefe
| 544937 ||  || — || November 25, 2014 || Haleakala || Pan-STARRS || H || align=right data-sort-value="0.48" | 480 m || 
|-id=938 bgcolor=#d6d6d6
| 544938 ||  || — || February 26, 2011 || Mount Lemmon || Mount Lemmon Survey ||  || align=right | 2.2 km || 
|-id=939 bgcolor=#E9E9E9
| 544939 ||  || — || December 5, 2005 || Mount Lemmon || Mount Lemmon Survey ||  || align=right | 1.9 km || 
|-id=940 bgcolor=#d6d6d6
| 544940 ||  || — || September 6, 2008 || Catalina || CSS ||  || align=right | 2.3 km || 
|-id=941 bgcolor=#E9E9E9
| 544941 ||  || — || August 31, 2005 || Palomar || NEAT ||  || align=right | 1.4 km || 
|-id=942 bgcolor=#E9E9E9
| 544942 ||  || — || September 21, 2009 || Mount Lemmon || Mount Lemmon Survey ||  || align=right | 1.6 km || 
|-id=943 bgcolor=#E9E9E9
| 544943 ||  || — || November 17, 2014 || Haleakala || Pan-STARRS ||  || align=right data-sort-value="0.78" | 780 m || 
|-id=944 bgcolor=#E9E9E9
| 544944 ||  || — || August 30, 2005 || Kitt Peak || Spacewatch ||  || align=right | 1.3 km || 
|-id=945 bgcolor=#d6d6d6
| 544945 ||  || — || November 26, 2014 || Haleakala || Pan-STARRS ||  || align=right | 2.0 km || 
|-id=946 bgcolor=#d6d6d6
| 544946 ||  || — || August 15, 2013 || Haleakala || Pan-STARRS ||  || align=right | 2.3 km || 
|-id=947 bgcolor=#d6d6d6
| 544947 ||  || — || November 21, 2003 || Palomar || NEAT ||  || align=right | 2.5 km || 
|-id=948 bgcolor=#d6d6d6
| 544948 ||  || — || November 24, 2014 || Mount Lemmon || Mount Lemmon Survey ||  || align=right | 2.1 km || 
|-id=949 bgcolor=#d6d6d6
| 544949 ||  || — || April 30, 2012 || Mount Lemmon || Mount Lemmon Survey ||  || align=right | 1.9 km || 
|-id=950 bgcolor=#E9E9E9
| 544950 ||  || — || March 15, 2007 || Catalina || CSS ||  || align=right | 2.0 km || 
|-id=951 bgcolor=#d6d6d6
| 544951 ||  || — || September 19, 2003 || Kitt Peak || Spacewatch ||  || align=right | 3.2 km || 
|-id=952 bgcolor=#d6d6d6
| 544952 ||  || — || July 13, 2013 || Haleakala || Pan-STARRS ||  || align=right | 2.2 km || 
|-id=953 bgcolor=#E9E9E9
| 544953 ||  || — || April 5, 2003 || Kitt Peak || Spacewatch ||  || align=right | 1.3 km || 
|-id=954 bgcolor=#d6d6d6
| 544954 ||  || — || October 27, 2009 || Mount Lemmon || Mount Lemmon Survey ||  || align=right | 2.2 km || 
|-id=955 bgcolor=#d6d6d6
| 544955 ||  || — || November 17, 2014 || Haleakala || Pan-STARRS ||  || align=right | 2.8 km || 
|-id=956 bgcolor=#E9E9E9
| 544956 ||  || — || February 25, 2012 || Kitt Peak || Spacewatch ||  || align=right data-sort-value="0.93" | 930 m || 
|-id=957 bgcolor=#d6d6d6
| 544957 ||  || — || February 16, 2010 || Kitt Peak || Spacewatch ||  || align=right | 2.3 km || 
|-id=958 bgcolor=#E9E9E9
| 544958 ||  || — || November 19, 2014 || Haleakala || Pan-STARRS ||  || align=right | 1.9 km || 
|-id=959 bgcolor=#d6d6d6
| 544959 ||  || — || July 16, 2013 || Haleakala || Pan-STARRS ||  || align=right | 1.8 km || 
|-id=960 bgcolor=#E9E9E9
| 544960 ||  || — || August 12, 2013 || Haleakala || Pan-STARRS ||  || align=right | 1.9 km || 
|-id=961 bgcolor=#E9E9E9
| 544961 ||  || — || November 20, 2014 || Haleakala || Pan-STARRS ||  || align=right | 2.3 km || 
|-id=962 bgcolor=#d6d6d6
| 544962 ||  || — || November 20, 2008 || Kitt Peak || Spacewatch ||  || align=right | 2.3 km || 
|-id=963 bgcolor=#d6d6d6
| 544963 ||  || — || November 21, 2014 || Haleakala || Pan-STARRS ||  || align=right | 2.3 km || 
|-id=964 bgcolor=#E9E9E9
| 544964 ||  || — || July 13, 2013 || Haleakala || Pan-STARRS ||  || align=right | 1.8 km || 
|-id=965 bgcolor=#d6d6d6
| 544965 ||  || — || November 23, 2014 || Mount Lemmon || Mount Lemmon Survey ||  || align=right | 2.3 km || 
|-id=966 bgcolor=#d6d6d6
| 544966 ||  || — || November 19, 2009 || Kitt Peak || Spacewatch ||  || align=right | 3.4 km || 
|-id=967 bgcolor=#d6d6d6
| 544967 ||  || — || September 3, 2008 || Kitt Peak || Spacewatch ||  || align=right | 2.9 km || 
|-id=968 bgcolor=#d6d6d6
| 544968 ||  || — || May 6, 2011 || Mount Lemmon || Mount Lemmon Survey ||  || align=right | 2.3 km || 
|-id=969 bgcolor=#d6d6d6
| 544969 ||  || — || November 26, 2014 || Haleakala || Pan-STARRS ||  || align=right | 2.0 km || 
|-id=970 bgcolor=#E9E9E9
| 544970 ||  || — || August 23, 2004 || Kitt Peak || Spacewatch ||  || align=right | 1.6 km || 
|-id=971 bgcolor=#d6d6d6
| 544971 ||  || — || September 24, 2013 || Catalina || CSS ||  || align=right | 3.0 km || 
|-id=972 bgcolor=#d6d6d6
| 544972 ||  || — || November 26, 2014 || Haleakala || Pan-STARRS ||  || align=right | 2.8 km || 
|-id=973 bgcolor=#d6d6d6
| 544973 ||  || — || September 6, 2013 || Kitt Peak || Spacewatch ||  || align=right | 2.7 km || 
|-id=974 bgcolor=#E9E9E9
| 544974 ||  || — || November 28, 2014 || Haleakala || Pan-STARRS ||  || align=right | 1.9 km || 
|-id=975 bgcolor=#d6d6d6
| 544975 ||  || — || November 28, 2014 || Haleakala || Pan-STARRS ||  || align=right | 2.3 km || 
|-id=976 bgcolor=#d6d6d6
| 544976 ||  || — || August 4, 2013 || Haleakala || Pan-STARRS ||  || align=right | 2.2 km || 
|-id=977 bgcolor=#C2E0FF
| 544977 ||  || — || November 23, 2014 || Haleakala || Pan-STARRS || other TNOcritical || align=right | 243 km || 
|-id=978 bgcolor=#d6d6d6
| 544978 ||  || — || April 21, 2013 || Haleakala || Pan-STARRS ||  || align=right | 4.2 km || 
|-id=979 bgcolor=#d6d6d6
| 544979 ||  || — || November 29, 2014 || Mount Lemmon || Mount Lemmon Survey ||  || align=right | 2.5 km || 
|-id=980 bgcolor=#d6d6d6
| 544980 ||  || — || November 30, 2014 || Mount Lemmon || Mount Lemmon Survey ||  || align=right | 2.6 km || 
|-id=981 bgcolor=#d6d6d6
| 544981 ||  || — || November 26, 2014 || Haleakala || Pan-STARRS ||  || align=right | 2.8 km || 
|-id=982 bgcolor=#E9E9E9
| 544982 ||  || — || June 22, 2001 || Palomar || NEAT ||  || align=right | 2.1 km || 
|-id=983 bgcolor=#E9E9E9
| 544983 ||  || — || March 11, 2007 || Kitt Peak || Spacewatch ||  || align=right | 2.9 km || 
|-id=984 bgcolor=#d6d6d6
| 544984 ||  || — || November 21, 2014 || Haleakala || Pan-STARRS ||  || align=right | 2.5 km || 
|-id=985 bgcolor=#E9E9E9
| 544985 ||  || — || March 15, 2008 || Mount Lemmon || Mount Lemmon Survey ||  || align=right | 1.3 km || 
|-id=986 bgcolor=#d6d6d6
| 544986 ||  || — || September 9, 2013 || Haleakala || Pan-STARRS ||  || align=right | 3.1 km || 
|-id=987 bgcolor=#E9E9E9
| 544987 ||  || — || November 9, 2009 || Kitt Peak || Spacewatch ||  || align=right | 2.5 km || 
|-id=988 bgcolor=#E9E9E9
| 544988 ||  || — || February 23, 2011 || Kitt Peak || Spacewatch ||  || align=right | 2.2 km || 
|-id=989 bgcolor=#E9E9E9
| 544989 ||  || — || October 5, 2005 || Bergisch Gladbach || W. Bickel ||  || align=right | 1.3 km || 
|-id=990 bgcolor=#E9E9E9
| 544990 ||  || — || September 23, 2014 || Haleakala || Pan-STARRS ||  || align=right data-sort-value="0.97" | 970 m || 
|-id=991 bgcolor=#E9E9E9
| 544991 ||  || — || November 22, 2014 || Mount Lemmon || Mount Lemmon Survey ||  || align=right | 1.2 km || 
|-id=992 bgcolor=#d6d6d6
| 544992 ||  || — || January 30, 2011 || Haleakala || Pan-STARRS ||  || align=right | 2.4 km || 
|-id=993 bgcolor=#d6d6d6
| 544993 ||  || — || November 27, 2014 || Kitt Peak || Spacewatch ||  || align=right | 2.5 km || 
|-id=994 bgcolor=#FA8072
| 544994 ||  || — || October 5, 2014 || Haleakala || Pan-STARRS || H || align=right data-sort-value="0.58" | 580 m || 
|-id=995 bgcolor=#FA8072
| 544995 ||  || — || January 15, 2010 || Kitt Peak || Spacewatch || H || align=right data-sort-value="0.61" | 610 m || 
|-id=996 bgcolor=#E9E9E9
| 544996 ||  || — || November 2, 2006 || Mount Lemmon || Mount Lemmon Survey ||  || align=right | 1.1 km || 
|-id=997 bgcolor=#d6d6d6
| 544997 ||  || — || July 15, 2013 || Haleakala || Pan-STARRS ||  || align=right | 2.6 km || 
|-id=998 bgcolor=#E9E9E9
| 544998 ||  || — || July 16, 2013 || Haleakala || Pan-STARRS ||  || align=right | 1.8 km || 
|-id=999 bgcolor=#E9E9E9
| 544999 ||  || — || June 27, 2001 || Kitt Peak || Spacewatch ||  || align=right | 1.3 km || 
|-id=000 bgcolor=#E9E9E9
| 545000 ||  || — || October 3, 2014 || Mount Lemmon || Mount Lemmon Survey ||  || align=right data-sort-value="0.97" | 970 m || 
|}

References

External links 
 Discovery Circumstances: Numbered Minor Planets (540001)–(545000) (IAU Minor Planet Center)

0544